

506001–506100 

|-bgcolor=#d6d6d6
| 506001 ||  || — || September 8, 2011 || Haleakala || Pan-STARRS ||  || align=right | 2.8 km || 
|-id=002 bgcolor=#E9E9E9
| 506002 ||  || — || April 11, 2007 || Kitt Peak || Spacewatch ||  || align=right | 1.5 km || 
|-id=003 bgcolor=#E9E9E9
| 506003 ||  || — || January 7, 2010 || Kitt Peak || Spacewatch ||  || align=right | 2.7 km || 
|-id=004 bgcolor=#E9E9E9
| 506004 ||  || — || June 4, 2011 || Mount Lemmon || Mount Lemmon Survey ||  || align=right | 1.8 km || 
|-id=005 bgcolor=#E9E9E9
| 506005 ||  || — || May 19, 2006 || Mount Lemmon || Mount Lemmon Survey ||  || align=right | 1.9 km || 
|-id=006 bgcolor=#d6d6d6
| 506006 ||  || — || June 16, 2005 || Kitt Peak || Spacewatch ||  || align=right | 2.7 km || 
|-id=007 bgcolor=#d6d6d6
| 506007 ||  || — || March 12, 2010 || WISE || WISE ||  || align=right | 3.2 km || 
|-id=008 bgcolor=#d6d6d6
| 506008 ||  || — || October 21, 1995 || Kitt Peak || Spacewatch ||  || align=right | 2.7 km || 
|-id=009 bgcolor=#d6d6d6
| 506009 ||  || — || October 30, 2007 || Mount Lemmon || Mount Lemmon Survey ||  || align=right | 2.6 km || 
|-id=010 bgcolor=#d6d6d6
| 506010 ||  || — || September 8, 2011 || Haleakala || Pan-STARRS ||  || align=right | 3.2 km || 
|-id=011 bgcolor=#d6d6d6
| 506011 ||  || — || February 12, 2010 || WISE || WISE ||  || align=right | 2.2 km || 
|-id=012 bgcolor=#d6d6d6
| 506012 ||  || — || March 22, 2015 || Haleakala || Pan-STARRS ||  || align=right | 3.0 km || 
|-id=013 bgcolor=#E9E9E9
| 506013 ||  || — || January 28, 2015 || Haleakala || Pan-STARRS ||  || align=right | 1.4 km || 
|-id=014 bgcolor=#E9E9E9
| 506014 ||  || — || March 20, 2010 || WISE || WISE ||  || align=right | 1.9 km || 
|-id=015 bgcolor=#d6d6d6
| 506015 ||  || — || September 26, 2011 || Haleakala || Pan-STARRS ||  || align=right | 2.0 km || 
|-id=016 bgcolor=#d6d6d6
| 506016 ||  || — || March 17, 2015 || Haleakala || Pan-STARRS ||  || align=right | 2.4 km || 
|-id=017 bgcolor=#d6d6d6
| 506017 ||  || — || September 26, 2011 || Haleakala || Pan-STARRS ||  || align=right | 2.9 km || 
|-id=018 bgcolor=#d6d6d6
| 506018 ||  || — || March 17, 2015 || Haleakala || Pan-STARRS ||  || align=right | 2.4 km || 
|-id=019 bgcolor=#E9E9E9
| 506019 ||  || — || March 25, 2015 || Mount Lemmon || Mount Lemmon Survey ||  || align=right | 1.6 km || 
|-id=020 bgcolor=#d6d6d6
| 506020 ||  || — || October 21, 2006 || Mount Lemmon || Mount Lemmon Survey ||  || align=right | 2.8 km || 
|-id=021 bgcolor=#d6d6d6
| 506021 ||  || — || May 29, 2010 || WISE || WISE || 7:4 || align=right | 2.9 km || 
|-id=022 bgcolor=#d6d6d6
| 506022 ||  || — || April 22, 2004 || Campo Imperatore || CINEOS ||  || align=right | 1.5 km || 
|-id=023 bgcolor=#E9E9E9
| 506023 ||  || — || December 25, 2013 || Mount Lemmon || Mount Lemmon Survey || AGN || align=right | 1.1 km || 
|-id=024 bgcolor=#d6d6d6
| 506024 ||  || — || March 9, 2010 || WISE || WISE ||  || align=right | 3.0 km || 
|-id=025 bgcolor=#d6d6d6
| 506025 ||  || — || January 28, 2014 || Mount Lemmon || Mount Lemmon Survey || EOS || align=right | 1.8 km || 
|-id=026 bgcolor=#d6d6d6
| 506026 ||  || — || December 31, 2013 || Haleakala || Pan-STARRS ||  || align=right | 3.9 km || 
|-id=027 bgcolor=#d6d6d6
| 506027 ||  || — || October 9, 2012 || Mount Lemmon || Mount Lemmon Survey ||  || align=right | 2.8 km || 
|-id=028 bgcolor=#C7FF8F
| 506028 ||  || — || May 30, 2014 || Mount Lemmon || Mount Lemmon Survey || centaur || align=right | 18 km || 
|-id=029 bgcolor=#d6d6d6
| 506029 ||  || — || February 10, 2014 || Mount Lemmon || Mount Lemmon Survey ||  || align=right | 3.4 km || 
|-id=030 bgcolor=#d6d6d6
| 506030 ||  || — || April 24, 2015 || Haleakala || Pan-STARRS ||  || align=right | 2.6 km || 
|-id=031 bgcolor=#E9E9E9
| 506031 ||  || — || February 22, 2006 || Catalina || CSS ||  || align=right | 1.7 km || 
|-id=032 bgcolor=#d6d6d6
| 506032 ||  || — || October 21, 2012 || Haleakala || Pan-STARRS ||  || align=right | 2.8 km || 
|-id=033 bgcolor=#d6d6d6
| 506033 ||  || — || December 13, 2012 || Mount Lemmon || Mount Lemmon Survey ||  || align=right | 2.4 km || 
|-id=034 bgcolor=#E9E9E9
| 506034 ||  || — || January 12, 2010 || Catalina || CSS ||  || align=right | 2.6 km || 
|-id=035 bgcolor=#d6d6d6
| 506035 ||  || — || May 9, 2010 || Mount Lemmon || Mount Lemmon Survey ||  || align=right | 2.1 km || 
|-id=036 bgcolor=#d6d6d6
| 506036 ||  || — || January 31, 2014 || Haleakala || Pan-STARRS ||  || align=right | 3.0 km || 
|-id=037 bgcolor=#d6d6d6
| 506037 ||  || — || October 4, 2006 || Mount Lemmon || Mount Lemmon Survey ||  || align=right | 2.6 km || 
|-id=038 bgcolor=#d6d6d6
| 506038 ||  || — || November 5, 2007 || Mount Lemmon || Mount Lemmon Survey ||  || align=right | 3.2 km || 
|-id=039 bgcolor=#E9E9E9
| 506039 ||  || — || April 18, 2010 || WISE || WISE ||  || align=right | 1.9 km || 
|-id=040 bgcolor=#d6d6d6
| 506040 ||  || — || April 10, 2015 || Kitt Peak || Spacewatch ||  || align=right | 2.7 km || 
|-id=041 bgcolor=#d6d6d6
| 506041 ||  || — || January 3, 2014 || Mount Lemmon || Mount Lemmon Survey ||  || align=right | 2.4 km || 
|-id=042 bgcolor=#d6d6d6
| 506042 ||  || — || May 21, 2015 || Haleakala || Pan-STARRS ||  || align=right | 2.7 km || 
|-id=043 bgcolor=#d6d6d6
| 506043 ||  || — || September 19, 2006 || Kitt Peak || Spacewatch ||  || align=right | 2.0 km || 
|-id=044 bgcolor=#d6d6d6
| 506044 ||  || — || February 24, 2014 || Haleakala || Pan-STARRS ||  || align=right | 3.2 km || 
|-id=045 bgcolor=#d6d6d6
| 506045 ||  || — || November 23, 2006 || Mount Lemmon || Mount Lemmon Survey ||  || align=right | 3.5 km || 
|-id=046 bgcolor=#d6d6d6
| 506046 ||  || — || February 24, 2014 || Haleakala || Pan-STARRS ||  || align=right | 2.6 km || 
|-id=047 bgcolor=#d6d6d6
| 506047 ||  || — || October 8, 2007 || Mount Lemmon || Mount Lemmon Survey ||  || align=right | 2.1 km || 
|-id=048 bgcolor=#d6d6d6
| 506048 ||  || — || September 24, 2011 || Haleakala || Pan-STARRS ||  || align=right | 2.8 km || 
|-id=049 bgcolor=#d6d6d6
| 506049 ||  || — || March 11, 2010 || WISE || WISE ||  || align=right | 2.4 km || 
|-id=050 bgcolor=#d6d6d6
| 506050 ||  || — || February 27, 2014 || Mount Lemmon || Mount Lemmon Survey ||  || align=right | 2.9 km || 
|-id=051 bgcolor=#E9E9E9
| 506051 ||  || — || February 9, 2005 || Mount Lemmon || Mount Lemmon Survey ||  || align=right | 2.0 km || 
|-id=052 bgcolor=#d6d6d6
| 506052 ||  || — || December 6, 2012 || Kitt Peak || Spacewatch ||  || align=right | 3.3 km || 
|-id=053 bgcolor=#d6d6d6
| 506053 ||  || — || October 20, 2011 || Mount Lemmon || Mount Lemmon Survey ||  || align=right | 2.4 km || 
|-id=054 bgcolor=#d6d6d6
| 506054 ||  || — || October 2, 2009 || Mount Lemmon || Mount Lemmon Survey || 3:2 || align=right | 5.1 km || 
|-id=055 bgcolor=#E9E9E9
| 506055 ||  || — || September 16, 2012 || Kitt Peak || Spacewatch ||  || align=right | 1.1 km || 
|-id=056 bgcolor=#d6d6d6
| 506056 ||  || — || January 20, 2009 || Mount Lemmon || Mount Lemmon Survey ||  || align=right | 2.7 km || 
|-id=057 bgcolor=#d6d6d6
| 506057 ||  || — || September 20, 2011 || Kitt Peak || Spacewatch ||  || align=right | 3.1 km || 
|-id=058 bgcolor=#E9E9E9
| 506058 ||  || — || October 1, 2008 || Mount Lemmon || Mount Lemmon Survey ||  || align=right | 1.6 km || 
|-id=059 bgcolor=#d6d6d6
| 506059 ||  || — || October 19, 2011 || Haleakala || Pan-STARRS ||  || align=right | 3.4 km || 
|-id=060 bgcolor=#d6d6d6
| 506060 ||  || — || April 30, 2010 || WISE || WISE ||  || align=right | 3.5 km || 
|-id=061 bgcolor=#fefefe
| 506061 ||  || — || March 26, 2007 || Kitt Peak || Spacewatch ||  || align=right data-sort-value="0.67" | 670 m || 
|-id=062 bgcolor=#d6d6d6
| 506062 ||  || — || April 23, 2015 || Haleakala || Pan-STARRS ||  || align=right | 2.6 km || 
|-id=063 bgcolor=#d6d6d6
| 506063 ||  || — || February 26, 2014 || Haleakala || Pan-STARRS ||  || align=right | 3.2 km || 
|-id=064 bgcolor=#d6d6d6
| 506064 ||  || — || April 19, 2015 || Mount Lemmon || Mount Lemmon Survey ||  || align=right | 3.1 km || 
|-id=065 bgcolor=#d6d6d6
| 506065 ||  || — || November 17, 2006 || Mount Lemmon || Mount Lemmon Survey ||  || align=right | 3.2 km || 
|-id=066 bgcolor=#d6d6d6
| 506066 ||  || — || July 27, 2011 || Haleakala || Pan-STARRS ||  || align=right | 3.0 km || 
|-id=067 bgcolor=#d6d6d6
| 506067 ||  || — || December 14, 2010 || Mount Lemmon || Mount Lemmon Survey || 3:2 || align=right | 4.1 km || 
|-id=068 bgcolor=#d6d6d6
| 506068 ||  || — || January 10, 2008 || Mount Lemmon || Mount Lemmon Survey || EOS || align=right | 1.5 km || 
|-id=069 bgcolor=#d6d6d6
| 506069 ||  || — || December 18, 2007 || Kitt Peak || Spacewatch ||  || align=right | 4.0 km || 
|-id=070 bgcolor=#d6d6d6
| 506070 ||  || — || December 8, 2005 || Kitt Peak || Spacewatch ||  || align=right | 3.0 km || 
|-id=071 bgcolor=#E9E9E9
| 506071 ||  || — || February 28, 2014 || Haleakala || Pan-STARRS ||  || align=right | 2.7 km || 
|-id=072 bgcolor=#E9E9E9
| 506072 ||  || — || September 9, 2007 || Mount Lemmon || Mount Lemmon Survey ||  || align=right data-sort-value="0.86" | 860 m || 
|-id=073 bgcolor=#d6d6d6
| 506073 ||  || — || May 27, 2014 || Haleakala || Pan-STARRS ||  || align=right | 3.6 km || 
|-id=074 bgcolor=#FFC2E0
| 506074 ||  || — || October 28, 2015 || MASTER-SAAO || MASTER || APOPHA || align=right data-sort-value="0.67" | 670 m || 
|-id=075 bgcolor=#d6d6d6
| 506075 ||  || — || November 14, 2010 || Catalina || CSS ||  || align=right | 2.7 km || 
|-id=076 bgcolor=#d6d6d6
| 506076 ||  || — || December 27, 2006 || Mount Lemmon || Mount Lemmon Survey ||  || align=right | 2.6 km || 
|-id=077 bgcolor=#d6d6d6
| 506077 ||  || — || September 11, 2015 || Haleakala || Pan-STARRS ||  || align=right | 4.0 km || 
|-id=078 bgcolor=#d6d6d6
| 506078 ||  || — || March 13, 2007 || Mount Lemmon || Mount Lemmon Survey ||  || align=right | 2.2 km || 
|-id=079 bgcolor=#E9E9E9
| 506079 ||  || — || October 25, 2011 || Haleakala || Pan-STARRS ||  || align=right | 1.2 km || 
|-id=080 bgcolor=#d6d6d6
| 506080 ||  || — || April 7, 2013 || Mount Lemmon || Mount Lemmon Survey ||  || align=right | 2.9 km || 
|-id=081 bgcolor=#d6d6d6
| 506081 ||  || — || December 14, 2010 || Mount Lemmon || Mount Lemmon Survey || VER || align=right | 2.1 km || 
|-id=082 bgcolor=#fefefe
| 506082 ||  || — || December 18, 2007 || Mount Lemmon || Mount Lemmon Survey || H || align=right data-sort-value="0.74" | 740 m || 
|-id=083 bgcolor=#fefefe
| 506083 ||  || — || December 24, 2012 || Mount Lemmon || Mount Lemmon Survey || H || align=right data-sort-value="0.80" | 800 m || 
|-id=084 bgcolor=#fefefe
| 506084 ||  || — || October 13, 2007 || Mount Lemmon || Mount Lemmon Survey ||  || align=right data-sort-value="0.76" | 760 m || 
|-id=085 bgcolor=#fefefe
| 506085 ||  || — || December 30, 2005 || Kitt Peak || Spacewatch || H || align=right data-sort-value="0.72" | 720 m || 
|-id=086 bgcolor=#FA8072
| 506086 ||  || — || May 21, 2014 || Haleakala || Pan-STARRS || H || align=right data-sort-value="0.62" | 620 m || 
|-id=087 bgcolor=#fefefe
| 506087 ||  || — || December 15, 2007 || Mount Lemmon || Mount Lemmon Survey || H || align=right data-sort-value="0.80" | 800 m || 
|-id=088 bgcolor=#fefefe
| 506088 ||  || — || January 10, 2006 || Mount Lemmon || Mount Lemmon Survey || H || align=right data-sort-value="0.40" | 400 m || 
|-id=089 bgcolor=#fefefe
| 506089 ||  || — || January 5, 2011 || Mount Lemmon || Mount Lemmon Survey || H || align=right data-sort-value="0.56" | 560 m || 
|-id=090 bgcolor=#d6d6d6
| 506090 ||  || — || August 6, 2014 || Haleakala || Pan-STARRS ||  || align=right | 2.8 km || 
|-id=091 bgcolor=#d6d6d6
| 506091 ||  || — || April 19, 2012 || Siding Spring || SSS ||  || align=right | 3.5 km || 
|-id=092 bgcolor=#fefefe
| 506092 ||  || — || May 25, 2014 || Haleakala || Pan-STARRS || H || align=right data-sort-value="0.55" | 550 m || 
|-id=093 bgcolor=#E9E9E9
| 506093 ||  || — || January 21, 2012 || Kitt Peak || Spacewatch ||  || align=right | 1.5 km || 
|-id=094 bgcolor=#E9E9E9
| 506094 ||  || — || September 3, 2010 || Mount Lemmon || Mount Lemmon Survey ||  || align=right data-sort-value="0.90" | 900 m || 
|-id=095 bgcolor=#E9E9E9
| 506095 ||  || — || March 27, 2003 || Kitt Peak || Spacewatch ||  || align=right | 2.0 km || 
|-id=096 bgcolor=#fefefe
| 506096 ||  || — || July 27, 2009 || Kitt Peak || Spacewatch || H || align=right data-sort-value="0.67" | 670 m || 
|-id=097 bgcolor=#fefefe
| 506097 ||  || — || August 27, 2014 || Haleakala || Pan-STARRS ||  || align=right data-sort-value="0.75" | 750 m || 
|-id=098 bgcolor=#fefefe
| 506098 ||  || — || July 25, 1995 || Kitt Peak || Spacewatch ||  || align=right | 1.3 km || 
|-id=099 bgcolor=#fefefe
| 506099 ||  || — || August 15, 2014 || Haleakala || Pan-STARRS || H || align=right data-sort-value="0.66" | 660 m || 
|-id=100 bgcolor=#E9E9E9
| 506100 ||  || — || February 29, 2012 || Mount Lemmon || Mount Lemmon Survey ||  || align=right | 1.4 km || 
|}

506101–506200 

|-bgcolor=#fefefe
| 506101 ||  || — || March 26, 2011 || Mount Lemmon || Mount Lemmon Survey || H || align=right data-sort-value="0.67" | 670 m || 
|-id=102 bgcolor=#fefefe
| 506102 ||  || — || May 8, 2013 || Haleakala || Pan-STARRS ||  || align=right data-sort-value="0.87" | 870 m || 
|-id=103 bgcolor=#d6d6d6
| 506103 ||  || — || December 5, 2010 || Mount Lemmon || Mount Lemmon Survey || EOS || align=right | 2.3 km || 
|-id=104 bgcolor=#d6d6d6
| 506104 ||  || — || October 22, 2003 || Kitt Peak || Spacewatch ||  || align=right | 3.3 km || 
|-id=105 bgcolor=#fefefe
| 506105 ||  || — || October 6, 2012 || Haleakala || Pan-STARRS || H || align=right data-sort-value="0.52" | 520 m || 
|-id=106 bgcolor=#fefefe
| 506106 ||  || — || January 3, 2016 || Mount Lemmon || Mount Lemmon Survey || H || align=right data-sort-value="0.77" | 770 m || 
|-id=107 bgcolor=#fefefe
| 506107 ||  || — || March 1, 2011 || Catalina || CSS || H || align=right data-sort-value="0.69" | 690 m || 
|-id=108 bgcolor=#fefefe
| 506108 ||  || — || September 17, 2003 || Anderson Mesa || LONEOS || H || align=right data-sort-value="0.98" | 980 m || 
|-id=109 bgcolor=#fefefe
| 506109 ||  || — || March 7, 2008 || Catalina || CSS || H || align=right data-sort-value="0.66" | 660 m || 
|-id=110 bgcolor=#fefefe
| 506110 ||  || — || January 11, 2008 || Catalina || CSS || H || align=right data-sort-value="0.65" | 650 m || 
|-id=111 bgcolor=#fefefe
| 506111 ||  || — || February 13, 2008 || Catalina || CSS || H || align=right data-sort-value="0.60" | 600 m || 
|-id=112 bgcolor=#fefefe
| 506112 ||  || — || February 12, 2011 || Catalina || CSS || H || align=right data-sort-value="0.71" | 710 m || 
|-id=113 bgcolor=#fefefe
| 506113 ||  || — || September 30, 2006 || Mount Lemmon || Mount Lemmon Survey || H || align=right data-sort-value="0.60" | 600 m || 
|-id=114 bgcolor=#FA8072
| 506114 ||  || — || February 29, 2008 || XuYi || PMO NEO || H || align=right data-sort-value="0.45" | 450 m || 
|-id=115 bgcolor=#fefefe
| 506115 ||  || — || February 27, 2008 || Mount Lemmon || Mount Lemmon Survey || H || align=right data-sort-value="0.60" | 600 m || 
|-id=116 bgcolor=#d6d6d6
| 506116 ||  || — || November 20, 2003 || Socorro || LINEAR ||  || align=right | 3.0 km || 
|-id=117 bgcolor=#fefefe
| 506117 ||  || — || January 15, 2016 || Haleakala || Pan-STARRS || H || align=right data-sort-value="0.66" | 660 m || 
|-id=118 bgcolor=#E9E9E9
| 506118 ||  || — || September 10, 2010 || Kitt Peak || Spacewatch ||  || align=right | 1.4 km || 
|-id=119 bgcolor=#FA8072
| 506119 ||  || — || January 26, 1993 || Kitt Peak || Spacewatch ||  || align=right data-sort-value="0.57" | 570 m || 
|-id=120 bgcolor=#d6d6d6
| 506120 ||  || — || March 31, 2010 || WISE || WISE ||  || align=right | 4.0 km || 
|-id=121 bgcolor=#C2E0FF
| 506121 ||  || — || January 27, 2016 || Kepler || Kepler || cubewano (cold)mooncritical || align=right | 255 km || 
|-id=122 bgcolor=#fefefe
| 506122 ||  || — || August 18, 2006 || Kitt Peak || Spacewatch || H || align=right data-sort-value="0.68" | 680 m || 
|-id=123 bgcolor=#fefefe
| 506123 ||  || — || March 2, 2008 || Catalina || CSS || H || align=right data-sort-value="0.71" | 710 m || 
|-id=124 bgcolor=#fefefe
| 506124 ||  || — || July 27, 2014 || Haleakala || Pan-STARRS || H || align=right data-sort-value="0.57" | 570 m || 
|-id=125 bgcolor=#fefefe
| 506125 ||  || — || November 12, 2007 || Socorro || LINEAR || H || align=right data-sort-value="0.78" | 780 m || 
|-id=126 bgcolor=#fefefe
| 506126 ||  || — || October 1, 2014 || Haleakala || Pan-STARRS ||  || align=right data-sort-value="0.73" | 730 m || 
|-id=127 bgcolor=#d6d6d6
| 506127 ||  || — || April 21, 2012 || Haleakala || Pan-STARRS ||  || align=right | 2.9 km || 
|-id=128 bgcolor=#d6d6d6
| 506128 ||  || — || January 8, 2010 || Catalina || CSS ||  || align=right | 3.9 km || 
|-id=129 bgcolor=#fefefe
| 506129 ||  || — || August 21, 2004 || Siding Spring || SSS || H || align=right data-sort-value="0.55" | 550 m || 
|-id=130 bgcolor=#fefefe
| 506130 ||  || — || September 26, 2006 || Kitt Peak || Spacewatch || H || align=right data-sort-value="0.55" | 550 m || 
|-id=131 bgcolor=#fefefe
| 506131 ||  || — || January 20, 2005 || Anderson Mesa || LONEOS || H || align=right data-sort-value="0.73" | 730 m || 
|-id=132 bgcolor=#fefefe
| 506132 ||  || — || February 2, 2008 || Kitt Peak || Spacewatch || H || align=right data-sort-value="0.60" | 600 m || 
|-id=133 bgcolor=#fefefe
| 506133 ||  || — || September 24, 2009 || Catalina || CSS || H || align=right data-sort-value="0.59" | 590 m || 
|-id=134 bgcolor=#fefefe
| 506134 ||  || — || February 12, 2008 || Mount Lemmon || Mount Lemmon Survey || H || align=right data-sort-value="0.57" | 570 m || 
|-id=135 bgcolor=#fefefe
| 506135 ||  || — || March 16, 2005 || Mount Lemmon || Mount Lemmon Survey || H || align=right data-sort-value="0.46" | 460 m || 
|-id=136 bgcolor=#fefefe
| 506136 ||  || — || September 17, 2009 || Mount Lemmon || Mount Lemmon Survey || H || align=right data-sort-value="0.54" | 540 m || 
|-id=137 bgcolor=#fefefe
| 506137 ||  || — || January 16, 2008 || Kitt Peak || Spacewatch || H || align=right data-sort-value="0.38" | 380 m || 
|-id=138 bgcolor=#fefefe
| 506138 ||  || — || October 26, 2012 || Haleakala || Pan-STARRS || H || align=right data-sort-value="0.59" | 590 m || 
|-id=139 bgcolor=#fefefe
| 506139 ||  || — || October 18, 2012 || Haleakala || Pan-STARRS || H || align=right data-sort-value="0.55" | 550 m || 
|-id=140 bgcolor=#fefefe
| 506140 ||  || — || October 23, 2012 || Mount Lemmon || Mount Lemmon Survey || H || align=right data-sort-value="0.79" | 790 m || 
|-id=141 bgcolor=#fefefe
| 506141 ||  || — || March 14, 2011 || Kitt Peak || Spacewatch || H || align=right data-sort-value="0.42" | 420 m || 
|-id=142 bgcolor=#fefefe
| 506142 ||  || — || March 24, 2006 || Anderson Mesa || LONEOS || H || align=right data-sort-value="0.72" | 720 m || 
|-id=143 bgcolor=#d6d6d6
| 506143 ||  || — || March 4, 2005 || Catalina || CSS ||  || align=right | 3.4 km || 
|-id=144 bgcolor=#fefefe
| 506144 ||  || — || February 20, 2016 || Haleakala || Pan-STARRS || H || align=right data-sort-value="0.62" | 620 m || 
|-id=145 bgcolor=#d6d6d6
| 506145 ||  || — || January 17, 2015 || Haleakala || Pan-STARRS ||  || align=right | 2.7 km || 
|-id=146 bgcolor=#fefefe
| 506146 ||  || — || December 22, 2012 || Haleakala || Pan-STARRS || H || align=right data-sort-value="0.51" | 510 m || 
|-id=147 bgcolor=#fefefe
| 506147 ||  || — || November 13, 2010 || Mount Lemmon || Mount Lemmon Survey ||  || align=right data-sort-value="0.91" | 910 m || 
|-id=148 bgcolor=#fefefe
| 506148 ||  || — || October 26, 2012 || Mount Lemmon || Mount Lemmon Survey || H || align=right data-sort-value="0.57" | 570 m || 
|-id=149 bgcolor=#fefefe
| 506149 ||  || — || September 30, 2003 || Kitt Peak || Spacewatch ||  || align=right data-sort-value="0.95" | 950 m || 
|-id=150 bgcolor=#fefefe
| 506150 ||  || — || October 11, 2010 || Mount Lemmon || Mount Lemmon Survey ||  || align=right | 1.0 km || 
|-id=151 bgcolor=#fefefe
| 506151 ||  || — || January 14, 2008 || Kitt Peak || Spacewatch || H || align=right data-sort-value="0.57" | 570 m || 
|-id=152 bgcolor=#fefefe
| 506152 ||  || — || March 15, 2013 || Kitt Peak || Spacewatch ||  || align=right data-sort-value="0.60" | 600 m || 
|-id=153 bgcolor=#fefefe
| 506153 ||  || — || April 18, 2009 || Mount Lemmon || Mount Lemmon Survey ||  || align=right data-sort-value="0.72" | 720 m || 
|-id=154 bgcolor=#fefefe
| 506154 ||  || — || October 17, 2014 || Mount Lemmon || Mount Lemmon Survey ||  || align=right data-sort-value="0.70" | 700 m || 
|-id=155 bgcolor=#fefefe
| 506155 ||  || — || February 20, 2009 || Kitt Peak || Spacewatch ||  || align=right data-sort-value="0.92" | 920 m || 
|-id=156 bgcolor=#fefefe
| 506156 ||  || — || March 10, 2005 || Mount Lemmon || Mount Lemmon Survey ||  || align=right data-sort-value="0.70" | 700 m || 
|-id=157 bgcolor=#fefefe
| 506157 ||  || — || January 30, 2008 || Mount Lemmon || Mount Lemmon Survey ||  || align=right data-sort-value="0.91" | 910 m || 
|-id=158 bgcolor=#E9E9E9
| 506158 ||  || — || February 10, 2016 || Haleakala || Pan-STARRS ||  || align=right | 2.2 km || 
|-id=159 bgcolor=#fefefe
| 506159 ||  || — || March 2, 2011 || Mount Lemmon || Mount Lemmon Survey || H || align=right data-sort-value="0.47" | 470 m || 
|-id=160 bgcolor=#fefefe
| 506160 ||  || — || April 4, 2008 || Kitt Peak || Spacewatch || H || align=right data-sort-value="0.55" | 550 m || 
|-id=161 bgcolor=#fefefe
| 506161 ||  || — || August 31, 2014 || Haleakala || Pan-STARRS || H || align=right data-sort-value="0.72" | 720 m || 
|-id=162 bgcolor=#fefefe
| 506162 ||  || — || April 2, 2006 || Kitt Peak || Spacewatch || H || align=right data-sort-value="0.40" | 400 m || 
|-id=163 bgcolor=#fefefe
| 506163 ||  || — || March 29, 2008 || Kitt Peak || Spacewatch || H || align=right data-sort-value="0.53" | 530 m || 
|-id=164 bgcolor=#fefefe
| 506164 ||  || — || October 6, 2012 || Mount Lemmon || Mount Lemmon Survey || H || align=right data-sort-value="0.42" | 420 m || 
|-id=165 bgcolor=#fefefe
| 506165 ||  || — || March 1, 2008 || Kitt Peak || Spacewatch || H || align=right data-sort-value="0.65" | 650 m || 
|-id=166 bgcolor=#fefefe
| 506166 ||  || — || November 24, 2012 || Haleakala || Pan-STARRS || H || align=right data-sort-value="0.68" | 680 m || 
|-id=167 bgcolor=#fefefe
| 506167 ||  || — || April 30, 2010 || WISE || WISE ||  || align=right data-sort-value="0.64" | 640 m || 
|-id=168 bgcolor=#fefefe
| 506168 ||  || — || November 11, 2006 || Mount Lemmon || Mount Lemmon Survey ||  || align=right data-sort-value="0.87" | 870 m || 
|-id=169 bgcolor=#fefefe
| 506169 ||  || — || February 11, 2016 || Haleakala || Pan-STARRS ||  || align=right data-sort-value="0.75" | 750 m || 
|-id=170 bgcolor=#fefefe
| 506170 ||  || — || August 27, 2009 || Kitt Peak || Spacewatch || H || align=right data-sort-value="0.55" | 550 m || 
|-id=171 bgcolor=#fefefe
| 506171 ||  || — || March 9, 2005 || Kitt Peak || Spacewatch || H || align=right data-sort-value="0.71" | 710 m || 
|-id=172 bgcolor=#fefefe
| 506172 ||  || — || April 30, 2011 || Mount Lemmon || Mount Lemmon Survey || H || align=right data-sort-value="0.48" | 480 m || 
|-id=173 bgcolor=#fefefe
| 506173 ||  || — || March 5, 2008 || Mount Lemmon || Mount Lemmon Survey || H || align=right data-sort-value="0.55" | 550 m || 
|-id=174 bgcolor=#fefefe
| 506174 ||  || — || October 25, 2009 || Kitt Peak || Spacewatch || H || align=right data-sort-value="0.59" | 590 m || 
|-id=175 bgcolor=#FA8072
| 506175 ||  || — || November 7, 2012 || Socorro || LINEAR || H || align=right data-sort-value="0.71" | 710 m || 
|-id=176 bgcolor=#E9E9E9
| 506176 ||  || — || October 30, 2009 || Mount Lemmon || Mount Lemmon Survey ||  || align=right data-sort-value="0.95" | 950 m || 
|-id=177 bgcolor=#E9E9E9
| 506177 ||  || — || October 1, 2005 || Mount Lemmon || Mount Lemmon Survey ||  || align=right | 1.7 km || 
|-id=178 bgcolor=#fefefe
| 506178 ||  || — || July 28, 2009 || Kitt Peak || Spacewatch ||  || align=right data-sort-value="0.81" | 810 m || 
|-id=179 bgcolor=#E9E9E9
| 506179 ||  || — || October 14, 2004 || Kitt Peak || Spacewatch ||  || align=right | 2.8 km || 
|-id=180 bgcolor=#E9E9E9
| 506180 ||  || — || February 8, 2007 || Kitt Peak || Spacewatch ||  || align=right | 1.7 km || 
|-id=181 bgcolor=#d6d6d6
| 506181 ||  || — || November 2, 2007 || Kitt Peak || Spacewatch ||  || align=right | 2.5 km || 
|-id=182 bgcolor=#fefefe
| 506182 ||  || — || August 8, 2013 || Haleakala || Pan-STARRS ||  || align=right data-sort-value="0.61" | 610 m || 
|-id=183 bgcolor=#fefefe
| 506183 ||  || — || August 29, 2006 || Kitt Peak || Spacewatch ||  || align=right data-sort-value="0.59" | 590 m || 
|-id=184 bgcolor=#fefefe
| 506184 ||  || — || September 18, 2006 || Kitt Peak || Spacewatch ||  || align=right data-sort-value="0.54" | 540 m || 
|-id=185 bgcolor=#E9E9E9
| 506185 ||  || — || March 4, 2016 || Haleakala || Pan-STARRS ||  || align=right | 1.5 km || 
|-id=186 bgcolor=#fefefe
| 506186 ||  || — || April 1, 2016 || Haleakala || Pan-STARRS ||  || align=right data-sort-value="0.68" | 680 m || 
|-id=187 bgcolor=#E9E9E9
| 506187 ||  || — || April 28, 2012 || Mount Lemmon || Mount Lemmon Survey ||  || align=right | 1.3 km || 
|-id=188 bgcolor=#E9E9E9
| 506188 ||  || — || October 12, 2009 || Mount Lemmon || Mount Lemmon Survey ||  || align=right | 2.1 km || 
|-id=189 bgcolor=#fefefe
| 506189 ||  || — || October 29, 2003 || Kitt Peak || Spacewatch ||  || align=right data-sort-value="0.75" | 750 m || 
|-id=190 bgcolor=#fefefe
| 506190 ||  || — || September 19, 2009 || Kitt Peak || Spacewatch || H || align=right data-sort-value="0.51" | 510 m || 
|-id=191 bgcolor=#E9E9E9
| 506191 ||  || — || August 29, 1995 || Kitt Peak || Spacewatch ||  || align=right | 1.6 km || 
|-id=192 bgcolor=#E9E9E9
| 506192 ||  || — || April 27, 2012 || Haleakala || Pan-STARRS ||  || align=right data-sort-value="0.63" | 630 m || 
|-id=193 bgcolor=#fefefe
| 506193 ||  || — || February 10, 2008 || Kitt Peak || Spacewatch ||  || align=right data-sort-value="0.97" | 970 m || 
|-id=194 bgcolor=#d6d6d6
| 506194 ||  || — || June 1, 2006 || Mount Lemmon || Mount Lemmon Survey ||  || align=right | 3.2 km || 
|-id=195 bgcolor=#fefefe
| 506195 ||  || — || June 15, 2009 || Kitt Peak || Spacewatch ||  || align=right | 1.0 km || 
|-id=196 bgcolor=#E9E9E9
| 506196 ||  || — || September 20, 2009 || Mount Lemmon || Mount Lemmon Survey || MAR || align=right data-sort-value="0.96" | 960 m || 
|-id=197 bgcolor=#E9E9E9
| 506197 ||  || — || April 24, 2003 || Kitt Peak || Spacewatch ||  || align=right | 1.4 km || 
|-id=198 bgcolor=#fefefe
| 506198 ||  || — || April 11, 2012 || Mount Lemmon || Mount Lemmon Survey ||  || align=right data-sort-value="0.84" | 840 m || 
|-id=199 bgcolor=#E9E9E9
| 506199 ||  || — || January 30, 2011 || Haleakala || Pan-STARRS ||  || align=right data-sort-value="0.98" | 980 m || 
|-id=200 bgcolor=#E9E9E9
| 506200 ||  || — || April 12, 2012 || Haleakala || Pan-STARRS ||  || align=right | 1.6 km || 
|}

506201–506300 

|-bgcolor=#E9E9E9
| 506201 ||  || — || March 25, 2012 || Mount Lemmon || Mount Lemmon Survey ||  || align=right | 1.0 km || 
|-id=202 bgcolor=#fefefe
| 506202 ||  || — || June 17, 2005 || Mount Lemmon || Mount Lemmon Survey ||  || align=right data-sort-value="0.70" | 700 m || 
|-id=203 bgcolor=#E9E9E9
| 506203 ||  || — || October 3, 2013 || Haleakala || Pan-STARRS ||  || align=right | 1.3 km || 
|-id=204 bgcolor=#fefefe
| 506204 ||  || — || April 4, 2008 || Kitt Peak || Spacewatch || H || align=right data-sort-value="0.65" | 650 m || 
|-id=205 bgcolor=#d6d6d6
| 506205 ||  || — || October 10, 2007 || Catalina || CSS || EOS || align=right | 2.7 km || 
|-id=206 bgcolor=#E9E9E9
| 506206 ||  || — || October 2, 2003 || Kitt Peak || Spacewatch ||  || align=right | 2.3 km || 
|-id=207 bgcolor=#fefefe
| 506207 ||  || — || March 1, 2008 || Kitt Peak || Spacewatch || H || align=right data-sort-value="0.51" | 510 m || 
|-id=208 bgcolor=#fefefe
| 506208 ||  || — || November 22, 2006 || Mount Lemmon || Mount Lemmon Survey || H || align=right data-sort-value="0.64" | 640 m || 
|-id=209 bgcolor=#fefefe
| 506209 ||  || — || May 13, 2008 || Mount Lemmon || Mount Lemmon Survey || H || align=right data-sort-value="0.68" | 680 m || 
|-id=210 bgcolor=#E9E9E9
| 506210 ||  || — || March 25, 2007 || Mount Lemmon || Mount Lemmon Survey ||  || align=right | 2.7 km || 
|-id=211 bgcolor=#fefefe
| 506211 ||  || — || May 5, 2011 || Mount Lemmon || Mount Lemmon Survey || H || align=right data-sort-value="0.73" | 730 m || 
|-id=212 bgcolor=#E9E9E9
| 506212 ||  || — || June 12, 2012 || Mount Lemmon || Mount Lemmon Survey ||  || align=right | 1.1 km || 
|-id=213 bgcolor=#d6d6d6
| 506213 ||  || — || July 7, 2010 || Kitt Peak || Spacewatch || Tj (2.93) || align=right | 2.7 km || 
|-id=214 bgcolor=#d6d6d6
| 506214 ||  || — || October 18, 2012 || Haleakala || Pan-STARRS ||  || align=right | 3.1 km || 
|-id=215 bgcolor=#E9E9E9
| 506215 ||  || — || July 30, 2008 || Catalina || CSS ||  || align=right | 1.6 km || 
|-id=216 bgcolor=#E9E9E9
| 506216 ||  || — || April 17, 2012 || Catalina || CSS ||  || align=right | 1.5 km || 
|-id=217 bgcolor=#d6d6d6
| 506217 ||  || — || January 25, 2015 || Haleakala || Pan-STARRS ||  || align=right | 3.3 km || 
|-id=218 bgcolor=#E9E9E9
| 506218 ||  || — || April 1, 2016 || Haleakala || Pan-STARRS ||  || align=right | 2.3 km || 
|-id=219 bgcolor=#E9E9E9
| 506219 ||  || — || May 10, 2008 || Mount Lemmon || Mount Lemmon Survey ||  || align=right | 2.0 km || 
|-id=220 bgcolor=#fefefe
| 506220 ||  || — || April 21, 2012 || Haleakala || Pan-STARRS ||  || align=right data-sort-value="0.99" | 990 m || 
|-id=221 bgcolor=#E9E9E9
| 506221 ||  || — || March 31, 2011 || Haleakala || Pan-STARRS ||  || align=right | 2.0 km || 
|-id=222 bgcolor=#E9E9E9
| 506222 ||  || — || March 15, 2016 || Haleakala || Pan-STARRS ||  || align=right | 1.7 km || 
|-id=223 bgcolor=#E9E9E9
| 506223 ||  || — || February 22, 2007 || Kitt Peak || Spacewatch ||  || align=right | 1.3 km || 
|-id=224 bgcolor=#E9E9E9
| 506224 ||  || — || July 28, 2008 || Mount Lemmon || Mount Lemmon Survey ||  || align=right | 1.9 km || 
|-id=225 bgcolor=#E9E9E9
| 506225 ||  || — || September 7, 2004 || Kitt Peak || Spacewatch ||  || align=right | 1.2 km || 
|-id=226 bgcolor=#E9E9E9
| 506226 ||  || — || January 17, 2015 || Mount Lemmon || Mount Lemmon Survey ||  || align=right | 2.3 km || 
|-id=227 bgcolor=#E9E9E9
| 506227 ||  || — || March 12, 2007 || Kitt Peak || Spacewatch ||  || align=right | 1.2 km || 
|-id=228 bgcolor=#E9E9E9
| 506228 ||  || — || January 14, 2001 || Kitt Peak || Spacewatch ||  || align=right | 2.7 km || 
|-id=229 bgcolor=#E9E9E9
| 506229 ||  || — || September 6, 2008 || Mount Lemmon || Mount Lemmon Survey ||  || align=right | 1.4 km || 
|-id=230 bgcolor=#fefefe
| 506230 ||  || — || May 26, 2009 || Kitt Peak || Spacewatch ||  || align=right data-sort-value="0.86" | 860 m || 
|-id=231 bgcolor=#fefefe
| 506231 ||  || — || May 24, 2009 || Siding Spring || SSS ||  || align=right | 1.3 km || 
|-id=232 bgcolor=#d6d6d6
| 506232 ||  || — || May 29, 2008 || Mount Lemmon || Mount Lemmon Survey || 3:2 || align=right | 5.3 km || 
|-id=233 bgcolor=#d6d6d6
| 506233 ||  || — || August 9, 2010 || WISE || WISE ||  || align=right | 3.3 km || 
|-id=234 bgcolor=#fefefe
| 506234 ||  || — || May 10, 2005 || Kitt Peak || Spacewatch ||  || align=right data-sort-value="0.77" | 770 m || 
|-id=235 bgcolor=#E9E9E9
| 506235 ||  || — || October 1, 2009 || Mount Lemmon || Mount Lemmon Survey ||  || align=right | 1.3 km || 
|-id=236 bgcolor=#d6d6d6
| 506236 ||  || — || April 8, 2010 || WISE || WISE ||  || align=right | 3.1 km || 
|-id=237 bgcolor=#d6d6d6
| 506237 ||  || — || November 4, 2007 || Mount Lemmon || Mount Lemmon Survey ||  || align=right | 4.9 km || 
|-id=238 bgcolor=#E9E9E9
| 506238 ||  || — || November 1, 2008 || Mount Lemmon || Mount Lemmon Survey ||  || align=right | 2.4 km || 
|-id=239 bgcolor=#d6d6d6
| 506239 ||  || — || September 4, 2011 || Haleakala || Pan-STARRS ||  || align=right | 2.6 km || 
|-id=240 bgcolor=#E9E9E9
| 506240 ||  || — || October 10, 2008 || Mount Lemmon || Mount Lemmon Survey ||  || align=right | 2.3 km || 
|-id=241 bgcolor=#E9E9E9
| 506241 ||  || — || March 15, 2007 || Mount Lemmon || Mount Lemmon Survey ||  || align=right | 1.5 km || 
|-id=242 bgcolor=#d6d6d6
| 506242 ||  || — || December 8, 1996 || Kitt Peak || Spacewatch ||  || align=right | 3.0 km || 
|-id=243 bgcolor=#E9E9E9
| 506243 ||  || — || March 14, 2007 || Kitt Peak || Spacewatch ||  || align=right | 1.1 km || 
|-id=244 bgcolor=#d6d6d6
| 506244 ||  || — || May 11, 2010 || Mount Lemmon || Mount Lemmon Survey ||  || align=right | 3.1 km || 
|-id=245 bgcolor=#E9E9E9
| 506245 ||  || — || October 13, 2007 || Mount Lemmon || Mount Lemmon Survey ||  || align=right | 1.9 km || 
|-id=246 bgcolor=#E9E9E9
| 506246 ||  || — || February 14, 2005 || Kitt Peak || Spacewatch ||  || align=right | 2.2 km || 
|-id=247 bgcolor=#d6d6d6
| 506247 ||  || — || January 25, 2014 || Haleakala || Pan-STARRS ||  || align=right | 2.3 km || 
|-id=248 bgcolor=#d6d6d6
| 506248 ||  || — || October 21, 2011 || Mount Lemmon || Mount Lemmon Survey ||  || align=right | 2.6 km || 
|-id=249 bgcolor=#d6d6d6
| 506249 ||  || — || July 31, 2011 || Haleakala || Pan-STARRS ||  || align=right | 2.9 km || 
|-id=250 bgcolor=#d6d6d6
| 506250 ||  || — || December 12, 2012 || Mount Lemmon || Mount Lemmon Survey ||  || align=right | 2.6 km || 
|-id=251 bgcolor=#d6d6d6
| 506251 ||  || — || September 24, 2011 || Haleakala || Pan-STARRS ||  || align=right | 2.5 km || 
|-id=252 bgcolor=#d6d6d6
| 506252 ||  || — || April 3, 2010 || WISE || WISE ||  || align=right | 3.2 km || 
|-id=253 bgcolor=#d6d6d6
| 506253 ||  || — || February 7, 2008 || Kitt Peak || Spacewatch ||  || align=right | 2.5 km || 
|-id=254 bgcolor=#d6d6d6
| 506254 ||  || — || November 16, 2006 || Kitt Peak || Spacewatch ||  || align=right | 2.8 km || 
|-id=255 bgcolor=#d6d6d6
| 506255 ||  || — || September 23, 2011 || Haleakala || Pan-STARRS ||  || align=right | 2.7 km || 
|-id=256 bgcolor=#d6d6d6
| 506256 ||  || — || October 27, 2005 || Kitt Peak || Spacewatch ||  || align=right | 3.2 km || 
|-id=257 bgcolor=#E9E9E9
| 506257 ||  || — || November 25, 2005 || Mount Lemmon || Mount Lemmon Survey ||  || align=right | 1.2 km || 
|-id=258 bgcolor=#d6d6d6
| 506258 ||  || — || March 8, 2008 || Mount Lemmon || Mount Lemmon Survey ||  || align=right | 3.1 km || 
|-id=259 bgcolor=#d6d6d6
| 506259 ||  || — || September 25, 2011 || Haleakala || Pan-STARRS ||  || align=right | 2.8 km || 
|-id=260 bgcolor=#d6d6d6
| 506260 ||  || — || September 27, 2011 || Mount Lemmon || Mount Lemmon Survey ||  || align=right | 3.0 km || 
|-id=261 bgcolor=#d6d6d6
| 506261 ||  || — || January 8, 2002 || Socorro || LINEAR ||  || align=right | 4.0 km || 
|-id=262 bgcolor=#E9E9E9
| 506262 ||  || — || February 15, 2010 || Mount Lemmon || Mount Lemmon Survey ||  || align=right | 1.5 km || 
|-id=263 bgcolor=#d6d6d6
| 506263 ||  || — || September 13, 2005 || Kitt Peak || Spacewatch ||  || align=right | 4.0 km || 
|-id=264 bgcolor=#d6d6d6
| 506264 ||  || — || March 31, 2009 || Kitt Peak || Spacewatch ||  || align=right | 3.3 km || 
|-id=265 bgcolor=#d6d6d6
| 506265 ||  || — || November 15, 2006 || Kitt Peak || Spacewatch ||  || align=right | 3.4 km || 
|-id=266 bgcolor=#d6d6d6
| 506266 ||  || — || December 18, 2001 || Socorro || LINEAR ||  || align=right | 2.9 km || 
|-id=267 bgcolor=#d6d6d6
| 506267 ||  || — || October 19, 2011 || Kitt Peak || Spacewatch ||  || align=right | 2.6 km || 
|-id=268 bgcolor=#d6d6d6
| 506268 ||  || — || March 28, 2010 || WISE || WISE ||  || align=right | 3.0 km || 
|-id=269 bgcolor=#d6d6d6
| 506269 ||  || — || October 10, 2005 || Catalina || CSS ||  || align=right | 3.9 km || 
|-id=270 bgcolor=#d6d6d6
| 506270 ||  || — || March 31, 2009 || Kitt Peak || Spacewatch ||  || align=right | 3.9 km || 
|-id=271 bgcolor=#d6d6d6
| 506271 ||  || — || October 2, 2006 || Mount Lemmon || Mount Lemmon Survey ||  || align=right | 3.9 km || 
|-id=272 bgcolor=#d6d6d6
| 506272 ||  || — || March 12, 2003 || Kitt Peak || Spacewatch ||  || align=right | 2.8 km || 
|-id=273 bgcolor=#d6d6d6
| 506273 ||  || — || December 17, 2001 || Socorro || LINEAR ||  || align=right | 2.7 km || 
|-id=274 bgcolor=#E9E9E9
| 506274 ||  || — || January 9, 2006 || Kitt Peak || Spacewatch ||  || align=right | 1.8 km || 
|-id=275 bgcolor=#d6d6d6
| 506275 ||  || — || November 2, 2011 || Mount Lemmon || Mount Lemmon Survey ||  || align=right | 3.1 km || 
|-id=276 bgcolor=#d6d6d6
| 506276 ||  || — || January 20, 1996 || Kitt Peak || Spacewatch ||  || align=right | 3.9 km || 
|-id=277 bgcolor=#d6d6d6
| 506277 ||  || — || November 1, 2006 || Mount Lemmon || Mount Lemmon Survey ||  || align=right | 3.2 km || 
|-id=278 bgcolor=#d6d6d6
| 506278 ||  || — || September 6, 2008 || Mount Lemmon || Mount Lemmon Survey || 3:2 || align=right | 4.2 km || 
|-id=279 bgcolor=#d6d6d6
| 506279 ||  || — || December 16, 2000 || Kitt Peak || Spacewatch ||  || align=right | 4.2 km || 
|-id=280 bgcolor=#d6d6d6
| 506280 ||  || — || October 20, 1993 || Kitt Peak || Spacewatch ||  || align=right | 3.8 km || 
|-id=281 bgcolor=#d6d6d6
| 506281 ||  || — || October 16, 2011 || Kitt Peak || Spacewatch ||  || align=right | 3.0 km || 
|-id=282 bgcolor=#d6d6d6
| 506282 ||  || — || October 7, 2005 || Kitt Peak || Spacewatch ||  || align=right | 2.7 km || 
|-id=283 bgcolor=#E9E9E9
| 506283 ||  || — || October 31, 2008 || Kitt Peak || Spacewatch ||  || align=right | 1.0 km || 
|-id=284 bgcolor=#E9E9E9
| 506284 ||  || — || March 9, 2005 || Mount Lemmon || Mount Lemmon Survey ||  || align=right | 2.2 km || 
|-id=285 bgcolor=#E9E9E9
| 506285 ||  || — || October 5, 2012 || Haleakala || Pan-STARRS ||  || align=right | 2.3 km || 
|-id=286 bgcolor=#E9E9E9
| 506286 ||  || — || April 12, 2004 || Kitt Peak || Spacewatch ||  || align=right | 1.8 km || 
|-id=287 bgcolor=#d6d6d6
| 506287 ||  || — || January 23, 2006 || Kitt Peak || Spacewatch ||  || align=right | 2.9 km || 
|-id=288 bgcolor=#d6d6d6
| 506288 ||  || — || February 2, 2000 || Socorro || LINEAR ||  || align=right | 3.6 km || 
|-id=289 bgcolor=#d6d6d6
| 506289 ||  || — || January 12, 2010 || WISE || WISE ||  || align=right | 2.9 km || 
|-id=290 bgcolor=#fefefe
| 506290 ||  || — || January 15, 2013 || Catalina || CSS ||  || align=right | 1.0 km || 
|-id=291 bgcolor=#d6d6d6
| 506291 ||  || — || January 12, 2010 || WISE || WISE ||  || align=right | 3.8 km || 
|-id=292 bgcolor=#d6d6d6
| 506292 ||  || — || December 30, 2005 || Mount Lemmon || Mount Lemmon Survey ||  || align=right | 3.3 km || 
|-id=293 bgcolor=#d6d6d6
| 506293 ||  || — || January 18, 2010 || WISE || WISE ||  || align=right | 2.7 km || 
|-id=294 bgcolor=#E9E9E9
| 506294 ||  || — || February 12, 2004 || Kitt Peak || Spacewatch ||  || align=right | 1.4 km || 
|-id=295 bgcolor=#E9E9E9
| 506295 ||  || — || September 15, 2004 || Anderson Mesa || LONEOS ||  || align=right | 2.6 km || 
|-id=296 bgcolor=#E9E9E9
| 506296 ||  || — || January 17, 2007 || Kitt Peak || Spacewatch ||  || align=right | 2.2 km || 
|-id=297 bgcolor=#FA8072
| 506297 ||  || — || October 1, 2000 || Socorro || LINEAR ||  || align=right | 1.2 km || 
|-id=298 bgcolor=#FA8072
| 506298 ||  || — || October 3, 2010 || Catalina || CSS ||  || align=right data-sort-value="0.69" | 690 m || 
|-id=299 bgcolor=#E9E9E9
| 506299 ||  || — || March 8, 2008 || Mount Lemmon || Mount Lemmon Survey ||  || align=right | 1.1 km || 
|-id=300 bgcolor=#E9E9E9
| 506300 ||  || — || October 10, 2004 || Socorro || LINEAR ||  || align=right | 3.9 km || 
|}

506301–506400 

|-bgcolor=#E9E9E9
| 506301 ||  || — || August 8, 2004 || Socorro || LINEAR ||  || align=right | 1.8 km || 
|-id=302 bgcolor=#fefefe
| 506302 ||  || — || July 5, 2010 || Kitt Peak || Spacewatch ||  || align=right data-sort-value="0.60" | 600 m || 
|-id=303 bgcolor=#fefefe
| 506303 ||  || — || November 19, 2003 || Kitt Peak || Spacewatch ||  || align=right | 1.2 km || 
|-id=304 bgcolor=#E9E9E9
| 506304 ||  || — || November 17, 2014 || Haleakala || Pan-STARRS ||  || align=right | 3.2 km || 
|-id=305 bgcolor=#E9E9E9
| 506305 ||  || — || November 11, 2013 || Mount Lemmon || Mount Lemmon Survey ||  || align=right | 3.1 km || 
|-id=306 bgcolor=#d6d6d6
| 506306 ||  || — || October 8, 2012 || Catalina || CSS ||  || align=right | 3.2 km || 
|-id=307 bgcolor=#E9E9E9
| 506307 ||  || — || September 24, 2008 || Catalina || CSS ||  || align=right | 2.5 km || 
|-id=308 bgcolor=#d6d6d6
| 506308 ||  || — || September 25, 2007 || Mount Lemmon || Mount Lemmon Survey ||  || align=right | 2.5 km || 
|-id=309 bgcolor=#E9E9E9
| 506309 ||  || — || November 9, 2009 || Kitt Peak || Spacewatch ||  || align=right | 1.6 km || 
|-id=310 bgcolor=#E9E9E9
| 506310 ||  || — || November 8, 2009 || Mount Lemmon || Mount Lemmon Survey ||  || align=right | 2.2 km || 
|-id=311 bgcolor=#fefefe
| 506311 ||  || — || March 13, 2013 || Catalina || CSS ||  || align=right data-sort-value="0.84" | 840 m || 
|-id=312 bgcolor=#E9E9E9
| 506312 ||  || — || November 17, 1999 || Kitt Peak || Spacewatch ||  || align=right | 2.8 km || 
|-id=313 bgcolor=#E9E9E9
| 506313 ||  || — || January 30, 2011 || Haleakala || Pan-STARRS ||  || align=right | 1.5 km || 
|-id=314 bgcolor=#E9E9E9
| 506314 ||  || — || January 10, 2006 || Kitt Peak || Spacewatch ||  || align=right | 2.7 km || 
|-id=315 bgcolor=#d6d6d6
| 506315 ||  || — || August 11, 2012 || Siding Spring || SSS ||  || align=right | 2.4 km || 
|-id=316 bgcolor=#fefefe
| 506316 ||  || — || November 4, 2004 || Catalina || CSS ||  || align=right data-sort-value="0.70" | 700 m || 
|-id=317 bgcolor=#d6d6d6
| 506317 ||  || — || September 23, 2001 || Kitt Peak || Spacewatch ||  || align=right | 2.3 km || 
|-id=318 bgcolor=#E9E9E9
| 506318 ||  || — || February 10, 2007 || Mount Lemmon || Mount Lemmon Survey ||  || align=right | 1.3 km || 
|-id=319 bgcolor=#fefefe
| 506319 ||  || — || March 6, 2008 || Mount Lemmon || Mount Lemmon Survey ||  || align=right | 1.1 km || 
|-id=320 bgcolor=#fefefe
| 506320 ||  || — || November 1, 2007 || Kitt Peak || Spacewatch ||  || align=right data-sort-value="0.69" | 690 m || 
|-id=321 bgcolor=#E9E9E9
| 506321 ||  || — || July 25, 2008 || Siding Spring || SSS ||  || align=right | 2.1 km || 
|-id=322 bgcolor=#fefefe
| 506322 ||  || — || July 29, 2000 || Anderson Mesa || LONEOS ||  || align=right data-sort-value="0.89" | 890 m || 
|-id=323 bgcolor=#d6d6d6
| 506323 ||  || — || June 23, 2007 || Kitt Peak || Spacewatch ||  || align=right | 2.7 km || 
|-id=324 bgcolor=#fefefe
| 506324 ||  || — || October 25, 2011 || Haleakala || Pan-STARRS ||  || align=right data-sort-value="0.73" | 730 m || 
|-id=325 bgcolor=#d6d6d6
| 506325 ||  || — || June 14, 2010 || WISE || WISE ||  || align=right | 3.6 km || 
|-id=326 bgcolor=#d6d6d6
| 506326 ||  || — || January 8, 2010 || Kitt Peak || Spacewatch ||  || align=right | 4.3 km || 
|-id=327 bgcolor=#fefefe
| 506327 ||  || — || February 2, 2005 || Kitt Peak || Spacewatch ||  || align=right data-sort-value="0.82" | 820 m || 
|-id=328 bgcolor=#E9E9E9
| 506328 ||  || — || March 28, 2012 || Kitt Peak || Spacewatch ||  || align=right | 1.5 km || 
|-id=329 bgcolor=#fefefe
| 506329 ||  || — || March 24, 2006 || Kitt Peak || Spacewatch ||  || align=right data-sort-value="0.67" | 670 m || 
|-id=330 bgcolor=#fefefe
| 506330 ||  || — || August 25, 2014 || Haleakala || Pan-STARRS ||  || align=right data-sort-value="0.68" | 680 m || 
|-id=331 bgcolor=#fefefe
| 506331 ||  || — || March 16, 2012 || Mount Lemmon || Mount Lemmon Survey ||  || align=right | 1.1 km || 
|-id=332 bgcolor=#fefefe
| 506332 ||  || — || December 14, 2007 || Socorro || LINEAR ||  || align=right data-sort-value="0.74" | 740 m || 
|-id=333 bgcolor=#E9E9E9
| 506333 ||  || — || September 16, 2009 || Catalina || CSS ||  || align=right | 1.3 km || 
|-id=334 bgcolor=#E9E9E9
| 506334 ||  || — || April 19, 2012 || Siding Spring || SSS ||  || align=right | 1.9 km || 
|-id=335 bgcolor=#E9E9E9
| 506335 ||  || — || July 3, 2008 || Mount Lemmon || Mount Lemmon Survey ||  || align=right | 2.7 km || 
|-id=336 bgcolor=#d6d6d6
| 506336 ||  || — || July 30, 1995 || Kitt Peak || Spacewatch ||  || align=right | 2.9 km || 
|-id=337 bgcolor=#fefefe
| 506337 ||  || — || October 4, 2006 || Mount Lemmon || Mount Lemmon Survey ||  || align=right | 1.1 km || 
|-id=338 bgcolor=#fefefe
| 506338 ||  || — || October 9, 2007 || Mount Lemmon || Mount Lemmon Survey ||  || align=right data-sort-value="0.77" | 770 m || 
|-id=339 bgcolor=#E9E9E9
| 506339 ||  || — || February 28, 2012 || Haleakala || Pan-STARRS ||  || align=right data-sort-value="0.91" | 910 m || 
|-id=340 bgcolor=#fefefe
| 506340 ||  || — || November 23, 2014 || Mount Lemmon || Mount Lemmon Survey ||  || align=right | 1.00 km || 
|-id=341 bgcolor=#fefefe
| 506341 ||  || — || October 12, 1999 || Socorro || LINEAR ||  || align=right | 1.5 km || 
|-id=342 bgcolor=#E9E9E9
| 506342 ||  || — || June 9, 2008 || Kitt Peak || Spacewatch ||  || align=right | 1.9 km || 
|-id=343 bgcolor=#E9E9E9
| 506343 ||  || — || September 6, 2008 || Mount Lemmon || Mount Lemmon Survey ||  || align=right | 1.9 km || 
|-id=344 bgcolor=#d6d6d6
| 506344 ||  || — || June 3, 2006 || Mount Lemmon || Mount Lemmon Survey ||  || align=right | 3.4 km || 
|-id=345 bgcolor=#d6d6d6
| 506345 ||  || — || September 10, 2007 || Mount Lemmon || Mount Lemmon Survey ||  || align=right | 3.0 km || 
|-id=346 bgcolor=#d6d6d6
| 506346 ||  || — || April 26, 2011 || Kitt Peak || Spacewatch ||  || align=right | 2.7 km || 
|-id=347 bgcolor=#E9E9E9
| 506347 ||  || — || February 13, 2011 || Mount Lemmon || Mount Lemmon Survey ||  || align=right | 2.2 km || 
|-id=348 bgcolor=#FA8072
| 506348 ||  || — || February 19, 2009 || Mount Lemmon || Mount Lemmon Survey ||  || align=right | 1.00 km || 
|-id=349 bgcolor=#E9E9E9
| 506349 ||  || — || January 26, 2006 || Kitt Peak || Spacewatch ||  || align=right | 2.2 km || 
|-id=350 bgcolor=#E9E9E9
| 506350 ||  || — || September 4, 2008 || Kitt Peak || Spacewatch ||  || align=right | 2.0 km || 
|-id=351 bgcolor=#E9E9E9
| 506351 ||  || — || September 24, 2008 || Mount Lemmon || Mount Lemmon Survey ||  || align=right | 2.1 km || 
|-id=352 bgcolor=#E9E9E9
| 506352 ||  || — || September 6, 2013 || Catalina || CSS ||  || align=right | 1.0 km || 
|-id=353 bgcolor=#fefefe
| 506353 ||  || — || January 23, 2006 || Socorro || LINEAR || H || align=right data-sort-value="0.62" | 620 m || 
|-id=354 bgcolor=#fefefe
| 506354 ||  || — || June 10, 2013 || Mount Lemmon || Mount Lemmon Survey ||  || align=right data-sort-value="0.88" | 880 m || 
|-id=355 bgcolor=#FA8072
| 506355 ||  || — || January 4, 2010 || Kitt Peak || Spacewatch ||  || align=right | 1.0 km || 
|-id=356 bgcolor=#fefefe
| 506356 ||  || — || February 9, 2008 || Kitt Peak || Spacewatch ||  || align=right | 1.3 km || 
|-id=357 bgcolor=#E9E9E9
| 506357 ||  || — || January 10, 2007 || Mount Lemmon || Mount Lemmon Survey ||  || align=right data-sort-value="0.76" | 760 m || 
|-id=358 bgcolor=#E9E9E9
| 506358 ||  || — || March 12, 2016 || Haleakala || Pan-STARRS ||  || align=right | 1.8 km || 
|-id=359 bgcolor=#E9E9E9
| 506359 ||  || — || November 9, 2009 || Kitt Peak || Spacewatch ||  || align=right | 2.1 km || 
|-id=360 bgcolor=#fefefe
| 506360 ||  || — || August 28, 2006 || Catalina || CSS ||  || align=right data-sort-value="0.66" | 660 m || 
|-id=361 bgcolor=#d6d6d6
| 506361 ||  || — || July 30, 2009 || Catalina || CSS || Tj (2.94) || align=right | 4.8 km || 
|-id=362 bgcolor=#d6d6d6
| 506362 ||  || — || December 11, 2004 || Kitt Peak || Spacewatch ||  || align=right | 3.5 km || 
|-id=363 bgcolor=#d6d6d6
| 506363 ||  || — || November 21, 2009 || Kitt Peak || Spacewatch || 3:2 || align=right | 5.3 km || 
|-id=364 bgcolor=#fefefe
| 506364 ||  || — || October 14, 2007 || Mount Lemmon || Mount Lemmon Survey ||  || align=right data-sort-value="0.68" | 680 m || 
|-id=365 bgcolor=#d6d6d6
| 506365 ||  || — || September 24, 2012 || Kitt Peak || Spacewatch ||  || align=right | 2.1 km || 
|-id=366 bgcolor=#fefefe
| 506366 ||  || — || October 11, 2010 || Mount Lemmon || Mount Lemmon Survey ||  || align=right data-sort-value="0.72" | 720 m || 
|-id=367 bgcolor=#d6d6d6
| 506367 ||  || — || November 3, 2007 || Kitt Peak || Spacewatch ||  || align=right | 2.8 km || 
|-id=368 bgcolor=#d6d6d6
| 506368 ||  || — || July 28, 2011 || Haleakala || Pan-STARRS ||  || align=right | 3.2 km || 
|-id=369 bgcolor=#E9E9E9
| 506369 ||  || — || September 14, 2013 || Mount Lemmon || Mount Lemmon Survey ||  || align=right | 1.6 km || 
|-id=370 bgcolor=#E9E9E9
| 506370 ||  || — || March 29, 2012 || Haleakala || Pan-STARRS ||  || align=right | 1.8 km || 
|-id=371 bgcolor=#d6d6d6
| 506371 ||  || — || February 2, 2006 || Mount Lemmon || Mount Lemmon Survey ||  || align=right | 3.6 km || 
|-id=372 bgcolor=#d6d6d6
| 506372 ||  || — || November 2, 2007 || Kitt Peak || Spacewatch ||  || align=right | 2.6 km || 
|-id=373 bgcolor=#fefefe
| 506373 ||  || — || May 8, 2013 || Haleakala || Pan-STARRS ||  || align=right data-sort-value="0.68" | 680 m || 
|-id=374 bgcolor=#d6d6d6
| 506374 ||  || — || October 29, 2008 || Kitt Peak || Spacewatch ||  || align=right | 2.9 km || 
|-id=375 bgcolor=#d6d6d6
| 506375 ||  || — || October 8, 2012 || Haleakala || Pan-STARRS ||  || align=right | 2.4 km || 
|-id=376 bgcolor=#E9E9E9
| 506376 ||  || — || April 12, 2010 || WISE || WISE ||  || align=right | 2.5 km || 
|-id=377 bgcolor=#E9E9E9
| 506377 ||  || — || August 21, 2000 || Anderson Mesa || LONEOS ||  || align=right | 1.4 km || 
|-id=378 bgcolor=#fefefe
| 506378 ||  || — || July 30, 2009 || Catalina || CSS ||  || align=right | 1.00 km || 
|-id=379 bgcolor=#E9E9E9
| 506379 ||  || — || November 4, 2013 || Kitt Peak || Spacewatch ||  || align=right | 2.1 km || 
|-id=380 bgcolor=#E9E9E9
| 506380 ||  || — || March 13, 2007 || Mount Lemmon || Mount Lemmon Survey ||  || align=right | 1.9 km || 
|-id=381 bgcolor=#fefefe
| 506381 ||  || — || June 28, 2005 || Kitt Peak || Spacewatch ||  || align=right data-sort-value="0.69" | 690 m || 
|-id=382 bgcolor=#fefefe
| 506382 ||  || — || August 12, 2013 || Haleakala || Pan-STARRS ||  || align=right data-sort-value="0.70" | 700 m || 
|-id=383 bgcolor=#d6d6d6
| 506383 ||  || — || March 9, 2005 || Mount Lemmon || Mount Lemmon Survey ||  || align=right | 2.4 km || 
|-id=384 bgcolor=#d6d6d6
| 506384 ||  || — || July 21, 2006 || Mount Lemmon || Mount Lemmon Survey ||  || align=right | 2.6 km || 
|-id=385 bgcolor=#d6d6d6
| 506385 ||  || — || March 4, 2010 || Kitt Peak || Spacewatch ||  || align=right | 2.6 km || 
|-id=386 bgcolor=#d6d6d6
| 506386 ||  || — || September 9, 2007 || Kitt Peak || Spacewatch ||  || align=right | 2.9 km || 
|-id=387 bgcolor=#fefefe
| 506387 ||  || — || April 14, 2005 || Kitt Peak || Spacewatch ||  || align=right data-sort-value="0.84" | 840 m || 
|-id=388 bgcolor=#fefefe
| 506388 ||  || — || October 1, 2010 || Catalina || CSS ||  || align=right data-sort-value="0.67" | 670 m || 
|-id=389 bgcolor=#fefefe
| 506389 ||  || — || October 9, 2007 || Mount Lemmon || Mount Lemmon Survey ||  || align=right data-sort-value="0.78" | 780 m || 
|-id=390 bgcolor=#fefefe
| 506390 ||  || — || November 29, 1994 || Kitt Peak || Spacewatch ||  || align=right | 1.1 km || 
|-id=391 bgcolor=#E9E9E9
| 506391 ||  || — || January 23, 2006 || Kitt Peak || Spacewatch ||  || align=right | 1.7 km || 
|-id=392 bgcolor=#E9E9E9
| 506392 ||  || — || February 8, 2011 || Mount Lemmon || Mount Lemmon Survey ||  || align=right | 1.4 km || 
|-id=393 bgcolor=#d6d6d6
| 506393 ||  || — || August 24, 2011 || XuYi || PMO NEO ||  || align=right | 3.5 km || 
|-id=394 bgcolor=#fefefe
| 506394 ||  || — || December 14, 2004 || Catalina || CSS ||  || align=right data-sort-value="0.83" | 830 m || 
|-id=395 bgcolor=#d6d6d6
| 506395 ||  || — || January 25, 2014 || Haleakala || Pan-STARRS ||  || align=right | 2.7 km || 
|-id=396 bgcolor=#E9E9E9
| 506396 ||  || — || August 17, 2012 || Haleakala || Pan-STARRS ||  || align=right | 2.1 km || 
|-id=397 bgcolor=#E9E9E9
| 506397 ||  || — || February 25, 2011 || Kitt Peak || Spacewatch ||  || align=right | 1.4 km || 
|-id=398 bgcolor=#E9E9E9
| 506398 ||  || — || March 16, 2012 || Mount Lemmon || Mount Lemmon Survey ||  || align=right data-sort-value="0.72" | 720 m || 
|-id=399 bgcolor=#FA8072
| 506399 ||  || — || August 8, 2007 || Siding Spring || SSS || H || align=right data-sort-value="0.71" | 710 m || 
|-id=400 bgcolor=#d6d6d6
| 506400 ||  || — || March 30, 2004 || Kitt Peak || Spacewatch ||  || align=right | 3.5 km || 
|}

506401–506500 

|-bgcolor=#E9E9E9
| 506401 ||  || — || December 13, 2004 || Campo Imperatore || CINEOS ||  || align=right | 2.0 km || 
|-id=402 bgcolor=#E9E9E9
| 506402 ||  || — || April 28, 2011 || Mount Lemmon || Mount Lemmon Survey ||  || align=right | 2.2 km || 
|-id=403 bgcolor=#E9E9E9
| 506403 ||  || — || April 4, 2011 || Catalina || CSS ||  || align=right | 2.6 km || 
|-id=404 bgcolor=#fefefe
| 506404 ||  || — || June 19, 2010 || Mount Lemmon || Mount Lemmon Survey ||  || align=right data-sort-value="0.71" | 710 m || 
|-id=405 bgcolor=#d6d6d6
| 506405 ||  || — || November 17, 2007 || Mount Lemmon || Mount Lemmon Survey ||  || align=right | 3.2 km || 
|-id=406 bgcolor=#d6d6d6
| 506406 ||  || — || March 26, 2011 || Mount Lemmon || Mount Lemmon Survey ||  || align=right | 2.5 km || 
|-id=407 bgcolor=#d6d6d6
| 506407 ||  || — || February 1, 1997 || Kitt Peak || Spacewatch ||  || align=right | 4.0 km || 
|-id=408 bgcolor=#E9E9E9
| 506408 ||  || — || April 25, 2007 || Mount Lemmon || Mount Lemmon Survey ||  || align=right | 2.3 km || 
|-id=409 bgcolor=#FA8072
| 506409 ||  || — || March 19, 2013 || Haleakala || Pan-STARRS ||  || align=right data-sort-value="0.58" | 580 m || 
|-id=410 bgcolor=#E9E9E9
| 506410 ||  || — || October 17, 1977 || Palomar || PLS ||  || align=right | 1.4 km || 
|-id=411 bgcolor=#E9E9E9
| 506411 ||  || — || October 15, 1995 || Kitt Peak || Spacewatch ||  || align=right | 2.1 km || 
|-id=412 bgcolor=#fefefe
| 506412 ||  || — || November 23, 1995 || Kitt Peak || Spacewatch ||  || align=right data-sort-value="0.73" | 730 m || 
|-id=413 bgcolor=#E9E9E9
| 506413 ||  || — || November 4, 1996 || Kitt Peak || Spacewatch ||  || align=right | 1.4 km || 
|-id=414 bgcolor=#d6d6d6
| 506414 ||  || — || November 10, 1996 || Kitt Peak || Spacewatch ||  || align=right | 2.7 km || 
|-id=415 bgcolor=#E9E9E9
| 506415 ||  || — || March 3, 1997 || Kitt Peak || Spacewatch ||  || align=right | 1.4 km || 
|-id=416 bgcolor=#fefefe
| 506416 ||  || — || August 26, 1998 || Kitt Peak || Spacewatch ||  || align=right data-sort-value="0.56" | 560 m || 
|-id=417 bgcolor=#fefefe
| 506417 ||  || — || October 10, 1999 || Kitt Peak || Spacewatch || ERI || align=right data-sort-value="0.93" | 930 m || 
|-id=418 bgcolor=#fefefe
| 506418 ||  || — || October 3, 1999 || Kitt Peak || Spacewatch || H || align=right data-sort-value="0.64" | 640 m || 
|-id=419 bgcolor=#E9E9E9
| 506419 ||  || — || October 3, 1999 || Socorro || LINEAR ||  || align=right | 2.0 km || 
|-id=420 bgcolor=#FA8072
| 506420 ||  || — || November 3, 1999 || Socorro || LINEAR ||  || align=right data-sort-value="0.70" | 700 m || 
|-id=421 bgcolor=#E9E9E9
| 506421 ||  || — || November 9, 1999 || Socorro || LINEAR ||  || align=right | 1.8 km || 
|-id=422 bgcolor=#E9E9E9
| 506422 ||  || — || November 4, 1999 || Kitt Peak || Spacewatch || MRX || align=right data-sort-value="0.88" | 880 m || 
|-id=423 bgcolor=#fefefe
| 506423 ||  || — || November 16, 1999 || Kitt Peak || Spacewatch ||  || align=right data-sort-value="0.54" | 540 m || 
|-id=424 bgcolor=#fefefe
| 506424 ||  || — || December 10, 1999 || Socorro || LINEAR ||  || align=right | 1.2 km || 
|-id=425 bgcolor=#FFC2E0
| 506425 ||  || — || February 29, 2000 || Socorro || LINEAR || AMO +1km || align=right | 1.7 km || 
|-id=426 bgcolor=#E9E9E9
| 506426 ||  || — || August 26, 2000 || Socorro || LINEAR ||  || align=right | 1.2 km || 
|-id=427 bgcolor=#FA8072
| 506427 ||  || — || September 1, 2000 || Socorro || LINEAR ||  || align=right | 1.3 km || 
|-id=428 bgcolor=#FA8072
| 506428 ||  || — || September 23, 2000 || Socorro || LINEAR ||  || align=right data-sort-value="0.87" | 870 m || 
|-id=429 bgcolor=#E9E9E9
| 506429 ||  || — || September 23, 2000 || Socorro || LINEAR ||  || align=right data-sort-value="0.94" | 940 m || 
|-id=430 bgcolor=#E9E9E9
| 506430 ||  || — || September 27, 2000 || Socorro || LINEAR ||  || align=right | 1.0 km || 
|-id=431 bgcolor=#E9E9E9
| 506431 ||  || — || October 1, 2000 || Socorro || LINEAR ||  || align=right | 1.0 km || 
|-id=432 bgcolor=#E9E9E9
| 506432 ||  || — || October 24, 2000 || Socorro || LINEAR ||  || align=right data-sort-value="0.85" | 850 m || 
|-id=433 bgcolor=#E9E9E9
| 506433 ||  || — || October 31, 2000 || Socorro || LINEAR ||  || align=right | 1.2 km || 
|-id=434 bgcolor=#d6d6d6
| 506434 ||  || — || October 25, 2000 || Socorro || LINEAR ||  || align=right | 3.3 km || 
|-id=435 bgcolor=#d6d6d6
| 506435 ||  || — || September 22, 2000 || Anderson Mesa || LONEOS ||  || align=right | 3.8 km || 
|-id=436 bgcolor=#E9E9E9
| 506436 ||  || — || October 25, 2000 || Socorro || LINEAR ||  || align=right | 1.2 km || 
|-id=437 bgcolor=#FFC2E0
| 506437 ||  || — || November 20, 2000 || Anderson Mesa || LONEOS || APO +1km || align=right data-sort-value="0.89" | 890 m || 
|-id=438 bgcolor=#E9E9E9
| 506438 ||  || — || December 5, 2000 || Socorro || LINEAR ||  || align=right | 1.6 km || 
|-id=439 bgcolor=#C2E0FF
| 506439 ||  || — || December 16, 2000 || Kitt Peak || M. J. Holman, B. Gladman, T. Grav || other TNO || align=right | 203 km || 
|-id=440 bgcolor=#fefefe
| 506440 ||  || — || November 27, 2000 || Socorro || LINEAR ||  || align=right | 1.2 km || 
|-id=441 bgcolor=#FA8072
| 506441 ||  || — || January 3, 2001 || Socorro || LINEAR ||  || align=right | 2.8 km || 
|-id=442 bgcolor=#FA8072
| 506442 ||  || — || December 22, 2000 || Kitt Peak || Spacewatch ||  || align=right data-sort-value="0.98" | 980 m || 
|-id=443 bgcolor=#FA8072
| 506443 ||  || — || February 3, 2001 || Socorro || LINEAR ||  || align=right | 1.3 km || 
|-id=444 bgcolor=#fefefe
| 506444 ||  || — || March 3, 2001 || Kitt Peak || Spacewatch || NYS || align=right data-sort-value="0.48" | 480 m || 
|-id=445 bgcolor=#d6d6d6
| 506445 ||  || — || July 27, 2001 || Anderson Mesa || LONEOS ||  || align=right | 3.2 km || 
|-id=446 bgcolor=#FA8072
| 506446 ||  || — || September 11, 2001 || Socorro || LINEAR ||  || align=right | 2.8 km || 
|-id=447 bgcolor=#d6d6d6
| 506447 ||  || — || September 19, 2001 || Socorro || LINEAR ||  || align=right | 2.0 km || 
|-id=448 bgcolor=#FA8072
| 506448 ||  || — || September 27, 2001 || Palomar || NEAT ||  || align=right data-sort-value="0.54" | 540 m || 
|-id=449 bgcolor=#d6d6d6
| 506449 ||  || — || October 15, 2001 || Socorro || LINEAR ||  || align=right | 2.6 km || 
|-id=450 bgcolor=#fefefe
| 506450 ||  || — || September 11, 2001 || Kitt Peak || Spacewatch ||  || align=right data-sort-value="0.55" | 550 m || 
|-id=451 bgcolor=#d6d6d6
| 506451 ||  || — || October 21, 2001 || Socorro || LINEAR ||  || align=right | 1.9 km || 
|-id=452 bgcolor=#d6d6d6
| 506452 ||  || — || October 23, 2001 || Socorro || LINEAR ||  || align=right | 3.4 km || 
|-id=453 bgcolor=#d6d6d6
| 506453 ||  || — || November 11, 2001 || Kitt Peak || Spacewatch || 3:2 || align=right | 3.0 km || 
|-id=454 bgcolor=#fefefe
| 506454 ||  || — || November 24, 2001 || Socorro || LINEAR || H || align=right data-sort-value="0.68" | 680 m || 
|-id=455 bgcolor=#E9E9E9
| 506455 ||  || — || December 11, 2001 || Socorro || LINEAR ||  || align=right data-sort-value="0.80" | 800 m || 
|-id=456 bgcolor=#d6d6d6
| 506456 ||  || — || December 15, 2001 || Socorro || LINEAR ||  || align=right | 3.4 km || 
|-id=457 bgcolor=#E9E9E9
| 506457 ||  || — || December 23, 2001 || Kitt Peak || Spacewatch ||  || align=right data-sort-value="0.84" | 840 m || 
|-id=458 bgcolor=#E9E9E9
| 506458 ||  || — || December 20, 2001 || Palomar || NEAT || (194) || align=right | 1.4 km || 
|-id=459 bgcolor=#FFC2E0
| 506459 ||  || — || January 11, 2002 || Socorro || LINEAR || APO +1km || align=right data-sort-value="0.93" | 930 m || 
|-id=460 bgcolor=#E9E9E9
| 506460 ||  || — || February 8, 2002 || Socorro || LINEAR ||  || align=right | 1.8 km || 
|-id=461 bgcolor=#E9E9E9
| 506461 ||  || — || March 18, 2002 || Desert Eagle || W. K. Y. Yeung ||  || align=right | 1.1 km || 
|-id=462 bgcolor=#E9E9E9
| 506462 ||  || — || April 8, 2002 || Palomar || NEAT ||  || align=right | 1.7 km || 
|-id=463 bgcolor=#E9E9E9
| 506463 ||  || — || April 14, 2002 || Anderson Mesa || LONEOS ||  || align=right | 1.8 km || 
|-id=464 bgcolor=#fefefe
| 506464 ||  || — || April 15, 2002 || Kitt Peak || Spacewatch ||  || align=right data-sort-value="0.66" | 660 m || 
|-id=465 bgcolor=#fefefe
| 506465 ||  || — || June 10, 2002 || Palomar || NEAT ||  || align=right data-sort-value="0.78" | 780 m || 
|-id=466 bgcolor=#d6d6d6
| 506466 ||  || — || June 14, 2002 || Kingsnake || J. V. McClusky ||  || align=right | 2.4 km || 
|-id=467 bgcolor=#fefefe
| 506467 ||  || — || July 6, 2002 || Kitt Peak || Spacewatch || NYS || align=right data-sort-value="0.51" | 510 m || 
|-id=468 bgcolor=#fefefe
| 506468 ||  || — || August 9, 2002 || Cerro Tololo || M. W. Buie ||  || align=right data-sort-value="0.54" | 540 m || 
|-id=469 bgcolor=#d6d6d6
| 506469 ||  || — || August 18, 2002 || Palomar || NEAT ||  || align=right | 1.8 km || 
|-id=470 bgcolor=#fefefe
| 506470 ||  || — || August 30, 2002 || Palomar || NEAT || MAS || align=right data-sort-value="0.57" | 570 m || 
|-id=471 bgcolor=#fefefe
| 506471 ||  || — || September 14, 2002 || Palomar || NEAT || MAS || align=right data-sort-value="0.48" | 480 m || 
|-id=472 bgcolor=#d6d6d6
| 506472 ||  || — || September 4, 2002 || Palomar || NEAT || KOR || align=right | 1.1 km || 
|-id=473 bgcolor=#d6d6d6
| 506473 ||  || — || January 5, 2003 || Anderson Mesa || LONEOS ||  || align=right | 2.9 km || 
|-id=474 bgcolor=#d6d6d6
| 506474 ||  || — || January 27, 2003 || Kitt Peak || Spacewatch ||  || align=right | 2.8 km || 
|-id=475 bgcolor=#d6d6d6
| 506475 ||  || — || March 7, 2003 || Needville || Needville Obs. ||  || align=right | 2.2 km || 
|-id=476 bgcolor=#d6d6d6
| 506476 ||  || — || March 12, 2003 || Kitt Peak || Spacewatch ||  || align=right | 2.3 km || 
|-id=477 bgcolor=#d6d6d6
| 506477 ||  || — || February 6, 2003 || Kitt Peak || Spacewatch ||  || align=right | 2.9 km || 
|-id=478 bgcolor=#E9E9E9
| 506478 ||  || — || April 9, 2003 || Kitt Peak || Spacewatch || MAR || align=right | 1.2 km || 
|-id=479 bgcolor=#C2E0FF
| 506479 ||  || — || April 26, 2003 || Mauna Kea || Mauna Kea Obs. || SDO || align=right | 147 km || 
|-id=480 bgcolor=#FA8072
| 506480 ||  || — || August 23, 2003 || Socorro || LINEAR ||  || align=right data-sort-value="0.62" | 620 m || 
|-id=481 bgcolor=#E9E9E9
| 506481 ||  || — || September 17, 2003 || Kitt Peak || Spacewatch ||  || align=right | 2.1 km || 
|-id=482 bgcolor=#E9E9E9
| 506482 ||  || — || September 20, 2003 || Socorro || LINEAR ||  || align=right | 2.0 km || 
|-id=483 bgcolor=#fefefe
| 506483 ||  || — || September 28, 2003 || Haleakala || NEAT ||  || align=right | 1.1 km || 
|-id=484 bgcolor=#E9E9E9
| 506484 ||  || — || September 29, 2003 || Kitt Peak || Spacewatch ||  || align=right | 1.2 km || 
|-id=485 bgcolor=#E9E9E9
| 506485 ||  || — || September 26, 2003 || Apache Point || SDSS || MRX || align=right data-sort-value="0.84" | 840 m || 
|-id=486 bgcolor=#fefefe
| 506486 ||  || — || September 21, 2003 || Kitt Peak || Spacewatch ||  || align=right data-sort-value="0.43" | 430 m || 
|-id=487 bgcolor=#E9E9E9
| 506487 ||  || — || September 18, 2003 || Kitt Peak || Spacewatch || EUN || align=right data-sort-value="0.88" | 880 m || 
|-id=488 bgcolor=#E9E9E9
| 506488 ||  || — || September 28, 2003 || Kitt Peak || Spacewatch || PAD || align=right | 1.3 km || 
|-id=489 bgcolor=#E9E9E9
| 506489 ||  || — || September 18, 2003 || Kitt Peak || Spacewatch || HOF || align=right | 1.9 km || 
|-id=490 bgcolor=#FA8072
| 506490 ||  || — || October 25, 2003 || Anderson Mesa || LONEOS ||  || align=right | 2.5 km || 
|-id=491 bgcolor=#FFC2E0
| 506491 ||  || — || October 25, 2003 || Socorro || LINEAR || APOPHA || align=right data-sort-value="0.27" | 270 m || 
|-id=492 bgcolor=#E9E9E9
| 506492 ||  || — || October 19, 2003 || Palomar || NEAT ||  || align=right | 2.5 km || 
|-id=493 bgcolor=#E9E9E9
| 506493 ||  || — || October 17, 2003 || Anderson Mesa || LONEOS ||  || align=right | 2.0 km || 
|-id=494 bgcolor=#E9E9E9
| 506494 ||  || — || October 18, 2003 || Apache Point || SDSS ||  || align=right | 1.4 km || 
|-id=495 bgcolor=#E9E9E9
| 506495 ||  || — || October 22, 2003 || Apache Point || SDSS ||  || align=right | 1.8 km || 
|-id=496 bgcolor=#fefefe
| 506496 ||  || — || September 18, 2003 || Kitt Peak || Spacewatch ||  || align=right data-sort-value="0.52" | 520 m || 
|-id=497 bgcolor=#fefefe
| 506497 ||  || — || October 19, 2003 || Kitt Peak || Spacewatch ||  || align=right data-sort-value="0.62" | 620 m || 
|-id=498 bgcolor=#E9E9E9
| 506498 ||  || — || November 19, 2003 || Catalina || CSS ||  || align=right | 2.3 km || 
|-id=499 bgcolor=#E9E9E9
| 506499 ||  || — || October 23, 2003 || Kitt Peak || Spacewatch ||  || align=right | 1.7 km || 
|-id=500 bgcolor=#E9E9E9
| 506500 ||  || — || September 30, 2003 || Kitt Peak || Spacewatch || MRX || align=right data-sort-value="0.82" | 820 m || 
|}

506501–506600 

|-bgcolor=#fefefe
| 506501 ||  || — || November 21, 2003 || Socorro || LINEAR || H || align=right data-sort-value="0.67" | 670 m || 
|-id=502 bgcolor=#fefefe
| 506502 ||  || — || December 19, 2003 || Kitt Peak || Spacewatch ||  || align=right data-sort-value="0.74" | 740 m || 
|-id=503 bgcolor=#fefefe
| 506503 ||  || — || December 19, 2003 || Socorro || LINEAR ||  || align=right | 1.3 km || 
|-id=504 bgcolor=#FA8072
| 506504 ||  || — || January 27, 2004 || Anderson Mesa || LONEOS ||  || align=right data-sort-value="0.75" | 750 m || 
|-id=505 bgcolor=#fefefe
| 506505 ||  || — || January 30, 2004 || Catalina || CSS ||  || align=right data-sort-value="0.85" | 850 m || 
|-id=506 bgcolor=#d6d6d6
| 506506 ||  || — || January 27, 2004 || Kitt Peak || Spacewatch || 3:2 || align=right | 5.5 km || 
|-id=507 bgcolor=#d6d6d6
| 506507 ||  || — || February 13, 2004 || Kitt Peak || Spacewatch ||  || align=right | 2.0 km || 
|-id=508 bgcolor=#fefefe
| 506508 ||  || — || March 15, 2004 || Catalina || CSS ||  || align=right data-sort-value="0.77" | 770 m || 
|-id=509 bgcolor=#d6d6d6
| 506509 ||  || — || March 15, 2004 || Kitt Peak || Spacewatch ||  || align=right | 2.0 km || 
|-id=510 bgcolor=#fefefe
| 506510 ||  || — || March 20, 2004 || Socorro || LINEAR ||  || align=right data-sort-value="0.73" | 730 m || 
|-id=511 bgcolor=#E9E9E9
| 506511 ||  || — || August 7, 2004 || Campo Imperatore || CINEOS ||  || align=right data-sort-value="0.86" | 860 m || 
|-id=512 bgcolor=#E9E9E9
| 506512 ||  || — || July 17, 2004 || Socorro || LINEAR || EUN || align=right | 1.2 km || 
|-id=513 bgcolor=#E9E9E9
| 506513 ||  || — || September 7, 2004 || Kitt Peak || Spacewatch ||  || align=right data-sort-value="0.79" | 790 m || 
|-id=514 bgcolor=#E9E9E9
| 506514 ||  || — || September 10, 2004 || Socorro || LINEAR ||  || align=right | 1.6 km || 
|-id=515 bgcolor=#FA8072
| 506515 ||  || — || September 10, 2004 || Socorro || LINEAR ||  || align=right data-sort-value="0.46" | 460 m || 
|-id=516 bgcolor=#E9E9E9
| 506516 ||  || — || August 20, 2004 || Catalina || CSS ||  || align=right | 1.7 km || 
|-id=517 bgcolor=#E9E9E9
| 506517 ||  || — || September 11, 2004 || Socorro || LINEAR ||  || align=right | 1.7 km || 
|-id=518 bgcolor=#E9E9E9
| 506518 ||  || — || September 15, 2004 || Kitt Peak || Spacewatch || ADE || align=right | 1.6 km || 
|-id=519 bgcolor=#E9E9E9
| 506519 ||  || — || September 19, 2004 || Siding Spring || SSS ||  || align=right | 1.9 km || 
|-id=520 bgcolor=#E9E9E9
| 506520 ||  || — || September 21, 2004 || Socorro || LINEAR ||  || align=right | 1.5 km || 
|-id=521 bgcolor=#fefefe
| 506521 ||  || — || October 5, 2004 || Anderson Mesa || LONEOS || H || align=right data-sort-value="0.77" | 770 m || 
|-id=522 bgcolor=#E9E9E9
| 506522 ||  || — || October 4, 2004 || Kitt Peak || Spacewatch ||  || align=right | 1.2 km || 
|-id=523 bgcolor=#E9E9E9
| 506523 ||  || — || October 5, 2004 || Kitt Peak || Spacewatch ||  || align=right | 1.3 km || 
|-id=524 bgcolor=#E9E9E9
| 506524 ||  || — || August 23, 2004 || Siding Spring || SSS ||  || align=right | 1.7 km || 
|-id=525 bgcolor=#E9E9E9
| 506525 ||  || — || August 23, 2004 || Siding Spring || SSS ||  || align=right | 1.3 km || 
|-id=526 bgcolor=#E9E9E9
| 506526 ||  || — || October 5, 2004 || Kitt Peak || Spacewatch ||  || align=right | 1.1 km || 
|-id=527 bgcolor=#E9E9E9
| 506527 ||  || — || October 5, 2004 || Kitt Peak || Spacewatch ||  || align=right | 1.3 km || 
|-id=528 bgcolor=#E9E9E9
| 506528 ||  || — || October 5, 2004 || Kitt Peak || Spacewatch ||  || align=right | 1.3 km || 
|-id=529 bgcolor=#fefefe
| 506529 ||  || — || October 6, 2004 || Kitt Peak || Spacewatch ||  || align=right data-sort-value="0.46" | 460 m || 
|-id=530 bgcolor=#E9E9E9
| 506530 ||  || — || September 23, 2004 || Kitt Peak || Spacewatch ||  || align=right | 1.1 km || 
|-id=531 bgcolor=#E9E9E9
| 506531 ||  || — || October 6, 2004 || Kitt Peak || Spacewatch ||  || align=right | 1.3 km || 
|-id=532 bgcolor=#E9E9E9
| 506532 ||  || — || October 7, 2004 || Kitt Peak || Spacewatch ||  || align=right | 2.2 km || 
|-id=533 bgcolor=#E9E9E9
| 506533 ||  || — || October 8, 2004 || Kitt Peak || Spacewatch ||  || align=right | 1.1 km || 
|-id=534 bgcolor=#fefefe
| 506534 ||  || — || October 4, 2004 || Kitt Peak || Spacewatch ||  || align=right data-sort-value="0.56" | 560 m || 
|-id=535 bgcolor=#E9E9E9
| 506535 ||  || — || October 10, 2004 || Socorro || LINEAR ||  || align=right | 1.5 km || 
|-id=536 bgcolor=#E9E9E9
| 506536 ||  || — || September 21, 2004 || Socorro || LINEAR ||  || align=right | 2.0 km || 
|-id=537 bgcolor=#E9E9E9
| 506537 ||  || — || October 9, 2004 || Kitt Peak || Spacewatch ||  || align=right data-sort-value="0.97" | 970 m || 
|-id=538 bgcolor=#fefefe
| 506538 ||  || — || October 10, 2004 || Kitt Peak || Spacewatch ||  || align=right data-sort-value="0.52" | 520 m || 
|-id=539 bgcolor=#E9E9E9
| 506539 ||  || — || December 9, 2004 || Catalina || CSS ||  || align=right | 1.6 km || 
|-id=540 bgcolor=#E9E9E9
| 506540 ||  || — || December 10, 2004 || Socorro || LINEAR ||  || align=right | 1.8 km || 
|-id=541 bgcolor=#E9E9E9
| 506541 ||  || — || December 15, 2004 || Campo Imperatore || CINEOS ||  || align=right | 2.1 km || 
|-id=542 bgcolor=#E9E9E9
| 506542 ||  || — || January 6, 2005 || Socorro || LINEAR || BAR || align=right | 1.4 km || 
|-id=543 bgcolor=#fefefe
| 506543 ||  || — || January 6, 2005 || Socorro || LINEAR || H || align=right data-sort-value="0.75" | 750 m || 
|-id=544 bgcolor=#fefefe
| 506544 ||  || — || March 3, 2005 || Kitt Peak || Spacewatch ||  || align=right data-sort-value="0.68" | 680 m || 
|-id=545 bgcolor=#E9E9E9
| 506545 ||  || — || March 3, 2005 || Catalina || CSS ||  || align=right | 2.2 km || 
|-id=546 bgcolor=#fefefe
| 506546 ||  || — || April 2, 2005 || Mount Lemmon || Mount Lemmon Survey ||  || align=right data-sort-value="0.57" | 570 m || 
|-id=547 bgcolor=#fefefe
| 506547 ||  || — || April 10, 2005 || Kitt Peak || Spacewatch || H || align=right data-sort-value="0.68" | 680 m || 
|-id=548 bgcolor=#fefefe
| 506548 ||  || — || July 4, 2005 || Mount Lemmon || Mount Lemmon Survey ||  || align=right data-sort-value="0.69" | 690 m || 
|-id=549 bgcolor=#d6d6d6
| 506549 ||  || — || July 6, 2005 || Kitt Peak || Spacewatch || TIR || align=right | 2.5 km || 
|-id=550 bgcolor=#fefefe
| 506550 ||  || — || July 1, 2005 || Kitt Peak || Spacewatch || H || align=right data-sort-value="0.79" | 790 m || 
|-id=551 bgcolor=#d6d6d6
| 506551 ||  || — || July 4, 2005 || Siding Spring || SSS ||  || align=right | 3.5 km || 
|-id=552 bgcolor=#d6d6d6
| 506552 ||  || — || August 28, 2005 || Kitt Peak || Spacewatch ||  || align=right | 2.6 km || 
|-id=553 bgcolor=#d6d6d6
| 506553 ||  || — || August 28, 2005 || Kitt Peak || Spacewatch || EOS || align=right | 1.8 km || 
|-id=554 bgcolor=#d6d6d6
| 506554 ||  || — || August 30, 2005 || Kitt Peak || Spacewatch ||  || align=right | 2.6 km || 
|-id=555 bgcolor=#fefefe
| 506555 ||  || — || September 23, 2005 || Catalina || CSS ||  || align=right data-sort-value="0.92" | 920 m || 
|-id=556 bgcolor=#d6d6d6
| 506556 ||  || — || September 25, 2005 || Kitt Peak || Spacewatch ||  || align=right | 2.7 km || 
|-id=557 bgcolor=#d6d6d6
| 506557 ||  || — || September 26, 2005 || Kitt Peak || Spacewatch ||  || align=right | 2.5 km || 
|-id=558 bgcolor=#d6d6d6
| 506558 ||  || — || September 26, 2005 || Kitt Peak || Spacewatch ||  || align=right | 2.5 km || 
|-id=559 bgcolor=#E9E9E9
| 506559 ||  || — || October 7, 2005 || Kitt Peak || Spacewatch ||  || align=right data-sort-value="0.74" | 740 m || 
|-id=560 bgcolor=#d6d6d6
| 506560 ||  || — || September 25, 2005 || Kitt Peak || Spacewatch || HYG || align=right | 2.3 km || 
|-id=561 bgcolor=#d6d6d6
| 506561 ||  || — || October 7, 2005 || Kitt Peak || Spacewatch ||  || align=right | 2.1 km || 
|-id=562 bgcolor=#fefefe
| 506562 ||  || — || October 6, 2005 || Kitt Peak || Spacewatch ||  || align=right data-sort-value="0.69" | 690 m || 
|-id=563 bgcolor=#d6d6d6
| 506563 ||  || — || September 29, 2005 || Kitt Peak || Spacewatch || Tj (2.95) || align=right | 3.1 km || 
|-id=564 bgcolor=#d6d6d6
| 506564 ||  || — || October 2, 2005 || Mount Lemmon || Mount Lemmon Survey ||  || align=right | 3.1 km || 
|-id=565 bgcolor=#E9E9E9
| 506565 ||  || — || October 24, 2005 || Kitt Peak || Spacewatch ||  || align=right data-sort-value="0.76" | 760 m || 
|-id=566 bgcolor=#E9E9E9
| 506566 ||  || — || October 22, 2005 || Kitt Peak || Spacewatch ||  || align=right data-sort-value="0.59" | 590 m || 
|-id=567 bgcolor=#E9E9E9
| 506567 ||  || — || October 23, 2005 || Catalina || CSS ||  || align=right data-sort-value="0.75" | 750 m || 
|-id=568 bgcolor=#E9E9E9
| 506568 ||  || — || October 22, 2005 || Kitt Peak || Spacewatch ||  || align=right data-sort-value="0.87" | 870 m || 
|-id=569 bgcolor=#fefefe
| 506569 ||  || — || October 24, 2005 || Kitt Peak || Spacewatch ||  || align=right data-sort-value="0.75" | 750 m || 
|-id=570 bgcolor=#E9E9E9
| 506570 ||  || — || October 26, 2005 || Kitt Peak || Spacewatch ||  || align=right data-sort-value="0.53" | 530 m || 
|-id=571 bgcolor=#d6d6d6
| 506571 ||  || — || October 24, 2005 || Kitt Peak || Spacewatch ||  || align=right | 3.4 km || 
|-id=572 bgcolor=#E9E9E9
| 506572 ||  || — || October 24, 2005 || Kitt Peak || Spacewatch ||  || align=right data-sort-value="0.76" | 760 m || 
|-id=573 bgcolor=#E9E9E9
| 506573 ||  || — || October 24, 2005 || Kitt Peak || Spacewatch || AGN || align=right | 1.1 km || 
|-id=574 bgcolor=#E9E9E9
| 506574 ||  || — || October 25, 2005 || Kitt Peak || Spacewatch || EUN || align=right data-sort-value="0.46" | 460 m || 
|-id=575 bgcolor=#E9E9E9
| 506575 ||  || — || October 25, 2005 || Kitt Peak || Spacewatch || HNS || align=right data-sort-value="0.82" | 820 m || 
|-id=576 bgcolor=#d6d6d6
| 506576 ||  || — || October 27, 2005 || Kitt Peak || Spacewatch ||  || align=right | 2.7 km || 
|-id=577 bgcolor=#E9E9E9
| 506577 ||  || — || October 29, 2005 || Mount Lemmon || Mount Lemmon Survey ||  || align=right data-sort-value="0.67" | 670 m || 
|-id=578 bgcolor=#E9E9E9
| 506578 ||  || — || October 31, 2005 || Mount Lemmon || Mount Lemmon Survey ||  || align=right | 2.9 km || 
|-id=579 bgcolor=#d6d6d6
| 506579 ||  || — || October 29, 2005 || Mount Lemmon || Mount Lemmon Survey ||  || align=right | 2.5 km || 
|-id=580 bgcolor=#E9E9E9
| 506580 ||  || — || November 1, 2005 || Kitt Peak || Spacewatch ||  || align=right data-sort-value="0.69" | 690 m || 
|-id=581 bgcolor=#E9E9E9
| 506581 ||  || — || October 25, 2005 || Kitt Peak || Spacewatch ||  || align=right data-sort-value="0.72" | 720 m || 
|-id=582 bgcolor=#fefefe
| 506582 ||  || — || November 1, 2005 || Apache Point || A. C. Becker ||  || align=right data-sort-value="0.54" | 540 m || 
|-id=583 bgcolor=#fefefe
| 506583 ||  || — || November 22, 2005 || Kitt Peak || Spacewatch ||  || align=right data-sort-value="0.65" | 650 m || 
|-id=584 bgcolor=#E9E9E9
| 506584 ||  || — || November 22, 2005 || Kitt Peak || Spacewatch ||  || align=right data-sort-value="0.81" | 810 m || 
|-id=585 bgcolor=#E9E9E9
| 506585 ||  || — || November 21, 2005 || Kitt Peak || Spacewatch ||  || align=right data-sort-value="0.72" | 720 m || 
|-id=586 bgcolor=#E9E9E9
| 506586 ||  || — || November 1, 2005 || Mount Lemmon || Mount Lemmon Survey || MAR || align=right data-sort-value="0.67" | 670 m || 
|-id=587 bgcolor=#E9E9E9
| 506587 ||  || — || November 28, 2005 || Mount Lemmon || Mount Lemmon Survey || EUN || align=right data-sort-value="0.86" | 860 m || 
|-id=588 bgcolor=#fefefe
| 506588 ||  || — || November 26, 2005 || Catalina || CSS ||  || align=right data-sort-value="0.79" | 790 m || 
|-id=589 bgcolor=#E9E9E9
| 506589 ||  || — || November 28, 2005 || Socorro || LINEAR ||  || align=right | 3.2 km || 
|-id=590 bgcolor=#FFC2E0
| 506590 ||  || — || December 4, 2005 || Mount Lemmon || Mount Lemmon Survey || APO || align=right data-sort-value="0.099" | 99 m || 
|-id=591 bgcolor=#E9E9E9
| 506591 ||  || — || December 1, 2005 || Kitt Peak || Spacewatch ||  || align=right data-sort-value="0.76" | 760 m || 
|-id=592 bgcolor=#E9E9E9
| 506592 ||  || — || December 4, 2005 || Mount Lemmon || Mount Lemmon Survey ||  || align=right data-sort-value="0.46" | 460 m || 
|-id=593 bgcolor=#E9E9E9
| 506593 ||  || — || December 4, 2005 || Kitt Peak || Spacewatch ||  || align=right data-sort-value="0.68" | 680 m || 
|-id=594 bgcolor=#E9E9E9
| 506594 ||  || — || December 22, 2005 || Kitt Peak || Spacewatch ||  || align=right data-sort-value="0.89" | 890 m || 
|-id=595 bgcolor=#E9E9E9
| 506595 ||  || — || December 24, 2005 || Kitt Peak || Spacewatch ||  || align=right data-sort-value="0.50" | 500 m || 
|-id=596 bgcolor=#E9E9E9
| 506596 ||  || — || December 29, 2005 || Kitt Peak || Spacewatch ||  || align=right data-sort-value="0.73" | 730 m || 
|-id=597 bgcolor=#E9E9E9
| 506597 ||  || — || December 27, 2005 || Kitt Peak || Spacewatch ||  || align=right data-sort-value="0.83" | 830 m || 
|-id=598 bgcolor=#d6d6d6
| 506598 ||  || — || December 25, 2005 || Kitt Peak || Spacewatch || SYL7:4 || align=right | 3.3 km || 
|-id=599 bgcolor=#E9E9E9
| 506599 ||  || — || January 4, 2006 || Kitt Peak || Spacewatch ||  || align=right | 1.3 km || 
|-id=600 bgcolor=#E9E9E9
| 506600 ||  || — || January 2, 2006 || Catalina || CSS ||  || align=right | 1.2 km || 
|}

506601–506700 

|-bgcolor=#FA8072
| 506601 ||  || — || January 7, 2006 || Mount Lemmon || Mount Lemmon Survey ||  || align=right data-sort-value="0.70" | 700 m || 
|-id=602 bgcolor=#E9E9E9
| 506602 ||  || — || January 22, 2006 || Mount Lemmon || Mount Lemmon Survey || EUN || align=right | 1.2 km || 
|-id=603 bgcolor=#E9E9E9
| 506603 ||  || — || January 8, 2006 || Kitt Peak || Spacewatch ||  || align=right data-sort-value="0.77" | 770 m || 
|-id=604 bgcolor=#E9E9E9
| 506604 ||  || — || January 9, 2006 || Kitt Peak || Spacewatch ||  || align=right data-sort-value="0.91" | 910 m || 
|-id=605 bgcolor=#fefefe
| 506605 ||  || — || January 22, 2006 || Mount Lemmon || Mount Lemmon Survey ||  || align=right data-sort-value="0.57" | 570 m || 
|-id=606 bgcolor=#E9E9E9
| 506606 ||  || — || January 28, 2006 || Mount Lemmon || Mount Lemmon Survey ||  || align=right data-sort-value="0.71" | 710 m || 
|-id=607 bgcolor=#E9E9E9
| 506607 ||  || — || January 22, 2006 || Anderson Mesa || LONEOS ||  || align=right | 1.7 km || 
|-id=608 bgcolor=#E9E9E9
| 506608 ||  || — || January 10, 2006 || Mount Lemmon || Mount Lemmon Survey ||  || align=right data-sort-value="0.80" | 800 m || 
|-id=609 bgcolor=#E9E9E9
| 506609 ||  || — || January 30, 2006 || Kitt Peak || Spacewatch ||  || align=right data-sort-value="0.65" | 650 m || 
|-id=610 bgcolor=#E9E9E9
| 506610 ||  || — || February 1, 2006 || Mount Lemmon || Mount Lemmon Survey ||  || align=right | 1.3 km || 
|-id=611 bgcolor=#E9E9E9
| 506611 ||  || — || February 2, 2006 || Kitt Peak || Spacewatch ||  || align=right | 1.2 km || 
|-id=612 bgcolor=#E9E9E9
| 506612 ||  || — || February 20, 2006 || Mount Lemmon || Mount Lemmon Survey ||  || align=right data-sort-value="0.91" | 910 m || 
|-id=613 bgcolor=#E9E9E9
| 506613 ||  || — || February 21, 2006 || Mount Lemmon || Mount Lemmon Survey ||  || align=right | 1.6 km || 
|-id=614 bgcolor=#E9E9E9
| 506614 ||  || — || February 26, 2006 || Anderson Mesa || LONEOS || BAR || align=right | 1.1 km || 
|-id=615 bgcolor=#E9E9E9
| 506615 ||  || — || February 1, 2006 || Kitt Peak || Spacewatch ||  || align=right | 1.7 km || 
|-id=616 bgcolor=#E9E9E9
| 506616 ||  || — || February 24, 2006 || Kitt Peak || Spacewatch ||  || align=right data-sort-value="0.98" | 980 m || 
|-id=617 bgcolor=#E9E9E9
| 506617 ||  || — || February 27, 2006 || Kitt Peak || Spacewatch ||  || align=right | 1.5 km || 
|-id=618 bgcolor=#E9E9E9
| 506618 ||  || — || February 2, 2006 || Mount Lemmon || Mount Lemmon Survey ||  || align=right | 1.3 km || 
|-id=619 bgcolor=#E9E9E9
| 506619 ||  || — || March 2, 2006 || Kitt Peak || Spacewatch ||  || align=right | 1.1 km || 
|-id=620 bgcolor=#E9E9E9
| 506620 ||  || — || March 4, 2006 || Kitt Peak || Spacewatch ||  || align=right | 1.5 km || 
|-id=621 bgcolor=#fefefe
| 506621 ||  || — || March 21, 2006 || Mount Lemmon || Mount Lemmon Survey || H || align=right data-sort-value="0.70" | 700 m || 
|-id=622 bgcolor=#d6d6d6
| 506622 ||  || — || March 25, 2006 || Kitt Peak || Spacewatch || 3:2 || align=right | 4.0 km || 
|-id=623 bgcolor=#fefefe
| 506623 ||  || — || March 23, 2006 || Kitt Peak || Spacewatch ||  || align=right data-sort-value="0.57" | 570 m || 
|-id=624 bgcolor=#fefefe
| 506624 ||  || — || March 25, 2006 || Kitt Peak || Spacewatch || H || align=right data-sort-value="0.35" | 350 m || 
|-id=625 bgcolor=#E9E9E9
| 506625 ||  || — || April 8, 2006 || Siding Spring || SSS ||  || align=right | 1.8 km || 
|-id=626 bgcolor=#E9E9E9
| 506626 ||  || — || April 25, 2006 || Kitt Peak || Spacewatch ||  || align=right | 1.8 km || 
|-id=627 bgcolor=#fefefe
| 506627 ||  || — || April 19, 2006 || Kitt Peak || Spacewatch ||  || align=right data-sort-value="0.69" | 690 m || 
|-id=628 bgcolor=#fefefe
| 506628 ||  || — || April 24, 2006 || Kitt Peak || Spacewatch ||  || align=right data-sort-value="0.66" | 660 m || 
|-id=629 bgcolor=#E9E9E9
| 506629 ||  || — || February 27, 2006 || Kitt Peak || Spacewatch || HNS || align=right | 1.4 km || 
|-id=630 bgcolor=#E9E9E9
| 506630 ||  || — || May 20, 2006 || Anderson Mesa || LONEOS ||  || align=right | 1.8 km || 
|-id=631 bgcolor=#E9E9E9
| 506631 ||  || — || May 21, 2006 || Kitt Peak || Spacewatch ||  || align=right | 2.3 km || 
|-id=632 bgcolor=#fefefe
| 506632 ||  || — || May 9, 2006 || Mount Lemmon || Mount Lemmon Survey ||  || align=right data-sort-value="0.59" | 590 m || 
|-id=633 bgcolor=#fefefe
| 506633 ||  || — || August 12, 2006 || Palomar || NEAT ||  || align=right | 1.1 km || 
|-id=634 bgcolor=#d6d6d6
| 506634 ||  || — || August 17, 2006 || Palomar || NEAT ||  || align=right | 2.0 km || 
|-id=635 bgcolor=#fefefe
| 506635 ||  || — || August 19, 2006 || Kitt Peak || Spacewatch || MAS || align=right data-sort-value="0.73" | 730 m || 
|-id=636 bgcolor=#fefefe
| 506636 ||  || — || August 21, 2006 || Kitt Peak || Spacewatch ||  || align=right data-sort-value="0.61" | 610 m || 
|-id=637 bgcolor=#d6d6d6
| 506637 ||  || — || August 19, 2006 || Anderson Mesa || LONEOS ||  || align=right | 3.0 km || 
|-id=638 bgcolor=#d6d6d6
| 506638 ||  || — || August 29, 2006 || Kitt Peak || Spacewatch ||  || align=right | 2.6 km || 
|-id=639 bgcolor=#d6d6d6
| 506639 ||  || — || September 14, 2006 || Kitt Peak || Spacewatch ||  || align=right | 2.6 km || 
|-id=640 bgcolor=#d6d6d6
| 506640 ||  || — || September 14, 2006 || Kitt Peak || Spacewatch ||  || align=right | 2.2 km || 
|-id=641 bgcolor=#d6d6d6
| 506641 ||  || — || September 14, 2006 || Kitt Peak || Spacewatch || THM || align=right | 2.0 km || 
|-id=642 bgcolor=#d6d6d6
| 506642 ||  || — || September 14, 2006 || Kitt Peak || Spacewatch ||  || align=right | 1.9 km || 
|-id=643 bgcolor=#fefefe
| 506643 ||  || — || September 15, 2006 || Kitt Peak || Spacewatch || H || align=right data-sort-value="0.58" | 580 m || 
|-id=644 bgcolor=#d6d6d6
| 506644 ||  || — || August 29, 2006 || Catalina || CSS ||  || align=right | 2.8 km || 
|-id=645 bgcolor=#fefefe
| 506645 ||  || — || September 15, 2006 || Kitt Peak || Spacewatch ||  || align=right data-sort-value="0.60" | 600 m || 
|-id=646 bgcolor=#fefefe
| 506646 ||  || — || September 15, 2006 || Kitt Peak || Spacewatch || MAS || align=right data-sort-value="0.54" | 540 m || 
|-id=647 bgcolor=#fefefe
| 506647 ||  || — || September 15, 2006 || Kitt Peak || Spacewatch || MAS || align=right data-sort-value="0.55" | 550 m || 
|-id=648 bgcolor=#fefefe
| 506648 ||  || — || August 27, 2006 || Kitt Peak || Spacewatch ||  || align=right data-sort-value="0.58" | 580 m || 
|-id=649 bgcolor=#d6d6d6
| 506649 ||  || — || September 17, 2006 || Kitt Peak || Spacewatch ||  || align=right | 2.2 km || 
|-id=650 bgcolor=#fefefe
| 506650 ||  || — || September 18, 2006 || Kitt Peak || Spacewatch ||  || align=right data-sort-value="0.80" | 800 m || 
|-id=651 bgcolor=#fefefe
| 506651 ||  || — || September 16, 2006 || Catalina || CSS ||  || align=right data-sort-value="0.73" | 730 m || 
|-id=652 bgcolor=#d6d6d6
| 506652 ||  || — || September 19, 2006 || Kitt Peak || Spacewatch ||  || align=right | 2.0 km || 
|-id=653 bgcolor=#d6d6d6
| 506653 ||  || — || September 24, 2006 || Kitt Peak || Spacewatch || THM || align=right | 1.8 km || 
|-id=654 bgcolor=#fefefe
| 506654 ||  || — || September 17, 2006 || Catalina || CSS || H || align=right data-sort-value="0.65" | 650 m || 
|-id=655 bgcolor=#d6d6d6
| 506655 ||  || — || September 19, 2006 || Kitt Peak || Spacewatch || EOS || align=right | 1.5 km || 
|-id=656 bgcolor=#fefefe
| 506656 ||  || — || September 19, 2006 || Catalina || CSS ||  || align=right data-sort-value="0.56" | 560 m || 
|-id=657 bgcolor=#d6d6d6
| 506657 ||  || — || September 22, 2006 || Kitt Peak || Spacewatch ||  || align=right | 2.7 km || 
|-id=658 bgcolor=#fefefe
| 506658 ||  || — || September 23, 2006 || Kitt Peak || Spacewatch ||  || align=right data-sort-value="0.50" | 500 m || 
|-id=659 bgcolor=#d6d6d6
| 506659 ||  || — || September 24, 2006 || Kitt Peak || Spacewatch || INA || align=right | 2.2 km || 
|-id=660 bgcolor=#fefefe
| 506660 ||  || — || September 25, 2006 || Kitt Peak || Spacewatch ||  || align=right data-sort-value="0.70" | 700 m || 
|-id=661 bgcolor=#fefefe
| 506661 ||  || — || September 18, 2006 || Kitt Peak || Spacewatch ||  || align=right data-sort-value="0.51" | 510 m || 
|-id=662 bgcolor=#fefefe
| 506662 ||  || — || September 26, 2006 || Kitt Peak || Spacewatch ||  || align=right data-sort-value="0.87" | 870 m || 
|-id=663 bgcolor=#d6d6d6
| 506663 ||  || — || September 18, 2006 || Kitt Peak || Spacewatch ||  || align=right | 2.1 km || 
|-id=664 bgcolor=#fefefe
| 506664 ||  || — || September 26, 2006 || Mount Lemmon || Mount Lemmon Survey || NYS || align=right data-sort-value="0.37" | 370 m || 
|-id=665 bgcolor=#fefefe
| 506665 ||  || — || September 26, 2006 || Kitt Peak || Spacewatch ||  || align=right data-sort-value="0.58" | 580 m || 
|-id=666 bgcolor=#fefefe
| 506666 ||  || — || September 26, 2006 || Kitt Peak || Spacewatch ||  || align=right data-sort-value="0.60" | 600 m || 
|-id=667 bgcolor=#d6d6d6
| 506667 ||  || — || September 28, 2006 || Mount Lemmon || Mount Lemmon Survey ||  || align=right | 3.1 km || 
|-id=668 bgcolor=#fefefe
| 506668 ||  || — || September 26, 2006 || La Sagra || OAM Obs. ||  || align=right data-sort-value="0.54" | 540 m || 
|-id=669 bgcolor=#fefefe
| 506669 ||  || — || September 19, 2006 || Catalina || CSS ||  || align=right data-sort-value="0.73" | 730 m || 
|-id=670 bgcolor=#fefefe
| 506670 ||  || — || September 25, 2006 || Kitt Peak || Spacewatch || NYS || align=right data-sort-value="0.48" | 480 m || 
|-id=671 bgcolor=#d6d6d6
| 506671 ||  || — || September 17, 2006 || Kitt Peak || Spacewatch ||  || align=right | 2.5 km || 
|-id=672 bgcolor=#d6d6d6
| 506672 ||  || — || September 28, 2006 || Kitt Peak || Spacewatch ||  || align=right | 1.8 km || 
|-id=673 bgcolor=#d6d6d6
| 506673 ||  || — || September 19, 2006 || Kitt Peak || Spacewatch ||  || align=right | 2.1 km || 
|-id=674 bgcolor=#d6d6d6
| 506674 ||  || — || September 30, 2006 || Catalina || CSS ||  || align=right | 2.5 km || 
|-id=675 bgcolor=#d6d6d6
| 506675 ||  || — || September 30, 2006 || Mount Lemmon || Mount Lemmon Survey ||  || align=right | 2.6 km || 
|-id=676 bgcolor=#d6d6d6
| 506676 ||  || — || September 25, 2006 || Kitt Peak || Spacewatch ||  || align=right | 1.8 km || 
|-id=677 bgcolor=#d6d6d6
| 506677 ||  || — || September 17, 2006 || Kitt Peak || Spacewatch || THM || align=right | 1.5 km || 
|-id=678 bgcolor=#d6d6d6
| 506678 ||  || — || September 25, 2006 || Kitt Peak || Spacewatch ||  || align=right | 1.8 km || 
|-id=679 bgcolor=#d6d6d6
| 506679 ||  || — || September 28, 2006 || Mount Lemmon || Mount Lemmon Survey ||  || align=right | 2.2 km || 
|-id=680 bgcolor=#d6d6d6
| 506680 ||  || — || September 19, 2006 || Kitt Peak || Spacewatch ||  || align=right | 2.0 km || 
|-id=681 bgcolor=#d6d6d6
| 506681 ||  || — || September 27, 2006 || Mount Lemmon || Mount Lemmon Survey ||  || align=right | 2.2 km || 
|-id=682 bgcolor=#d6d6d6
| 506682 ||  || — || September 26, 2006 || Mount Lemmon || Mount Lemmon Survey || THM || align=right | 1.9 km || 
|-id=683 bgcolor=#fefefe
| 506683 ||  || — || October 11, 2006 || Kitt Peak || Spacewatch ||  || align=right data-sort-value="0.78" | 780 m || 
|-id=684 bgcolor=#fefefe
| 506684 ||  || — || October 11, 2006 || Kitt Peak || Spacewatch ||  || align=right data-sort-value="0.55" | 550 m || 
|-id=685 bgcolor=#fefefe
| 506685 ||  || — || October 12, 2006 || Kitt Peak || Spacewatch ||  || align=right data-sort-value="0.52" | 520 m || 
|-id=686 bgcolor=#fefefe
| 506686 ||  || — || September 30, 2006 || Mount Lemmon || Mount Lemmon Survey ||  || align=right data-sort-value="0.59" | 590 m || 
|-id=687 bgcolor=#fefefe
| 506687 ||  || — || October 4, 2006 || Mount Lemmon || Mount Lemmon Survey || MAS || align=right data-sort-value="0.62" | 620 m || 
|-id=688 bgcolor=#d6d6d6
| 506688 ||  || — || September 26, 2006 || Mount Lemmon || Mount Lemmon Survey ||  || align=right | 3.5 km || 
|-id=689 bgcolor=#d6d6d6
| 506689 ||  || — || October 2, 2006 || Mount Lemmon || Mount Lemmon Survey ||  || align=right | 3.1 km || 
|-id=690 bgcolor=#d6d6d6
| 506690 ||  || — || October 12, 2006 || Kitt Peak || Spacewatch || LIX || align=right | 3.1 km || 
|-id=691 bgcolor=#d6d6d6
| 506691 ||  || — || October 13, 2006 || Kitt Peak || Spacewatch ||  || align=right | 2.1 km || 
|-id=692 bgcolor=#d6d6d6
| 506692 ||  || — || October 2, 2006 || Mount Lemmon || Mount Lemmon Survey ||  || align=right | 1.9 km || 
|-id=693 bgcolor=#d6d6d6
| 506693 ||  || — || October 13, 2006 || Kitt Peak || Spacewatch ||  || align=right | 1.8 km || 
|-id=694 bgcolor=#fefefe
| 506694 ||  || — || September 27, 2006 || Mount Lemmon || Mount Lemmon Survey || MAS || align=right data-sort-value="0.51" | 510 m || 
|-id=695 bgcolor=#fefefe
| 506695 ||  || — || October 15, 2006 || Kitt Peak || Spacewatch ||  || align=right data-sort-value="0.61" | 610 m || 
|-id=696 bgcolor=#fefefe
| 506696 ||  || — || October 2, 2006 || Mount Lemmon || Mount Lemmon Survey || NYS || align=right data-sort-value="0.42" | 420 m || 
|-id=697 bgcolor=#d6d6d6
| 506697 ||  || — || October 16, 2006 || Kitt Peak || Spacewatch ||  || align=right | 2.4 km || 
|-id=698 bgcolor=#d6d6d6
| 506698 ||  || — || October 17, 2006 || Kitt Peak || Spacewatch ||  || align=right | 2.7 km || 
|-id=699 bgcolor=#fefefe
| 506699 ||  || — || September 30, 2006 || Mount Lemmon || Mount Lemmon Survey || NYS || align=right data-sort-value="0.49" | 490 m || 
|-id=700 bgcolor=#d6d6d6
| 506700 ||  || — || September 28, 2006 || Catalina || CSS ||  || align=right | 3.4 km || 
|}

506701–506800 

|-bgcolor=#d6d6d6
| 506701 ||  || — || October 17, 2006 || Mount Lemmon || Mount Lemmon Survey ||  || align=right | 3.5 km || 
|-id=702 bgcolor=#d6d6d6
| 506702 ||  || — || September 26, 2006 || Kitt Peak || Spacewatch ||  || align=right | 2.3 km || 
|-id=703 bgcolor=#d6d6d6
| 506703 ||  || — || September 26, 2006 || Kitt Peak || Spacewatch ||  || align=right | 2.2 km || 
|-id=704 bgcolor=#fefefe
| 506704 ||  || — || October 17, 2006 || Mount Lemmon || Mount Lemmon Survey ||  || align=right data-sort-value="0.81" | 810 m || 
|-id=705 bgcolor=#fefefe
| 506705 ||  || — || September 17, 2006 || Kitt Peak || Spacewatch ||  || align=right data-sort-value="0.66" | 660 m || 
|-id=706 bgcolor=#d6d6d6
| 506706 ||  || — || October 17, 2006 || Kitt Peak || Spacewatch ||  || align=right | 2.4 km || 
|-id=707 bgcolor=#d6d6d6
| 506707 ||  || — || October 18, 2006 || Kitt Peak || Spacewatch ||  || align=right | 2.0 km || 
|-id=708 bgcolor=#d6d6d6
| 506708 ||  || — || October 3, 2006 || Mount Lemmon || Mount Lemmon Survey ||  || align=right | 2.0 km || 
|-id=709 bgcolor=#d6d6d6
| 506709 ||  || — || October 19, 2006 || Kitt Peak || Spacewatch ||  || align=right | 2.1 km || 
|-id=710 bgcolor=#d6d6d6
| 506710 ||  || — || September 25, 2006 || Mount Lemmon || Mount Lemmon Survey ||  || align=right | 2.4 km || 
|-id=711 bgcolor=#fefefe
| 506711 ||  || — || October 2, 2006 || Mount Lemmon || Mount Lemmon Survey ||  || align=right data-sort-value="0.61" | 610 m || 
|-id=712 bgcolor=#d6d6d6
| 506712 ||  || — || September 27, 2006 || Kitt Peak || Spacewatch ||  || align=right | 2.0 km || 
|-id=713 bgcolor=#d6d6d6
| 506713 ||  || — || October 21, 2006 || Mount Lemmon || Mount Lemmon Survey ||  || align=right | 2.5 km || 
|-id=714 bgcolor=#d6d6d6
| 506714 ||  || — || October 19, 2006 || Catalina || CSS ||  || align=right | 3.1 km || 
|-id=715 bgcolor=#fefefe
| 506715 ||  || — || October 20, 2006 || Kitt Peak || Spacewatch ||  || align=right data-sort-value="0.61" | 610 m || 
|-id=716 bgcolor=#fefefe
| 506716 ||  || — || October 21, 2006 || Kitt Peak || Spacewatch ||  || align=right data-sort-value="0.87" | 870 m || 
|-id=717 bgcolor=#d6d6d6
| 506717 ||  || — || October 23, 2006 || Kitt Peak || Spacewatch ||  || align=right | 2.9 km || 
|-id=718 bgcolor=#d6d6d6
| 506718 ||  || — || October 17, 2006 || Kitt Peak || Spacewatch ||  || align=right | 3.0 km || 
|-id=719 bgcolor=#fefefe
| 506719 ||  || — || October 4, 2006 || Mount Lemmon || Mount Lemmon Survey ||  || align=right data-sort-value="0.60" | 600 m || 
|-id=720 bgcolor=#d6d6d6
| 506720 ||  || — || September 26, 2006 || Kitt Peak || Spacewatch ||  || align=right | 2.5 km || 
|-id=721 bgcolor=#d6d6d6
| 506721 ||  || — || September 30, 2006 || Mount Lemmon || Mount Lemmon Survey ||  || align=right | 1.8 km || 
|-id=722 bgcolor=#d6d6d6
| 506722 ||  || — || September 28, 2006 || Mount Lemmon || Mount Lemmon Survey ||  || align=right | 2.1 km || 
|-id=723 bgcolor=#d6d6d6
| 506723 ||  || — || October 27, 2006 || Mount Lemmon || Mount Lemmon Survey || THM || align=right | 1.8 km || 
|-id=724 bgcolor=#fefefe
| 506724 ||  || — || October 27, 2006 || Mount Lemmon || Mount Lemmon Survey || H || align=right data-sort-value="0.62" | 620 m || 
|-id=725 bgcolor=#fefefe
| 506725 ||  || — || September 27, 2006 || Mount Lemmon || Mount Lemmon Survey ||  || align=right data-sort-value="0.78" | 780 m || 
|-id=726 bgcolor=#d6d6d6
| 506726 ||  || — || October 27, 2006 || Kitt Peak || Spacewatch ||  || align=right | 2.3 km || 
|-id=727 bgcolor=#fefefe
| 506727 ||  || — || September 27, 2006 || Mount Lemmon || Mount Lemmon Survey ||  || align=right data-sort-value="0.80" | 800 m || 
|-id=728 bgcolor=#d6d6d6
| 506728 ||  || — || October 27, 2006 || Kitt Peak || Spacewatch || URS || align=right | 2.7 km || 
|-id=729 bgcolor=#d6d6d6
| 506729 ||  || — || September 25, 2006 || Kitt Peak || Spacewatch || EOS || align=right | 1.2 km || 
|-id=730 bgcolor=#d6d6d6
| 506730 ||  || — || October 16, 2006 || Kitt Peak || Spacewatch ||  || align=right | 2.9 km || 
|-id=731 bgcolor=#d6d6d6
| 506731 ||  || — || September 17, 2006 || Kitt Peak || Spacewatch ||  || align=right | 2.0 km || 
|-id=732 bgcolor=#FFC2E0
| 506732 ||  || — || November 11, 2006 || Mount Lemmon || Mount Lemmon Survey || APOPHA || align=right data-sort-value="0.20" | 200 m || 
|-id=733 bgcolor=#d6d6d6
| 506733 ||  || — || September 30, 2006 || Mount Lemmon || Mount Lemmon Survey ||  || align=right | 3.0 km || 
|-id=734 bgcolor=#fefefe
| 506734 ||  || — || September 30, 2006 || Mount Lemmon || Mount Lemmon Survey || NYS || align=right data-sort-value="0.41" | 410 m || 
|-id=735 bgcolor=#d6d6d6
| 506735 ||  || — || November 10, 2006 || Kitt Peak || Spacewatch ||  || align=right | 3.2 km || 
|-id=736 bgcolor=#fefefe
| 506736 ||  || — || October 18, 2006 || Kitt Peak || Spacewatch ||  || align=right data-sort-value="0.70" | 700 m || 
|-id=737 bgcolor=#d6d6d6
| 506737 ||  || — || October 27, 2006 || Mount Lemmon || Mount Lemmon Survey || THM || align=right | 1.7 km || 
|-id=738 bgcolor=#d6d6d6
| 506738 ||  || — || October 13, 2006 || Kitt Peak || Spacewatch ||  || align=right | 2.0 km || 
|-id=739 bgcolor=#d6d6d6
| 506739 ||  || — || September 28, 2006 || Mount Lemmon || Mount Lemmon Survey || THM || align=right | 1.7 km || 
|-id=740 bgcolor=#d6d6d6
| 506740 ||  || — || November 11, 2006 || Kitt Peak || Spacewatch ||  || align=right | 2.5 km || 
|-id=741 bgcolor=#d6d6d6
| 506741 ||  || — || October 23, 2006 || Mount Lemmon || Mount Lemmon Survey ||  || align=right | 2.4 km || 
|-id=742 bgcolor=#fefefe
| 506742 ||  || — || September 30, 2006 || Mount Lemmon || Mount Lemmon Survey || NYS || align=right data-sort-value="0.52" | 520 m || 
|-id=743 bgcolor=#d6d6d6
| 506743 ||  || — || November 11, 2006 || Kitt Peak || Spacewatch ||  || align=right | 3.0 km || 
|-id=744 bgcolor=#d6d6d6
| 506744 ||  || — || September 27, 2006 || Mount Lemmon || Mount Lemmon Survey || THM || align=right | 2.2 km || 
|-id=745 bgcolor=#d6d6d6
| 506745 ||  || — || November 11, 2006 || Kitt Peak || Spacewatch || THM || align=right | 1.8 km || 
|-id=746 bgcolor=#d6d6d6
| 506746 ||  || — || November 12, 2006 || Mount Lemmon || Mount Lemmon Survey ||  || align=right | 1.9 km || 
|-id=747 bgcolor=#d6d6d6
| 506747 ||  || — || October 17, 2006 || Mount Lemmon || Mount Lemmon Survey ||  || align=right | 2.2 km || 
|-id=748 bgcolor=#fefefe
| 506748 ||  || — || October 23, 2006 || Mount Lemmon || Mount Lemmon Survey ||  || align=right data-sort-value="0.65" | 650 m || 
|-id=749 bgcolor=#fefefe
| 506749 ||  || — || October 3, 2006 || Mount Lemmon || Mount Lemmon Survey || NYS || align=right data-sort-value="0.42" | 420 m || 
|-id=750 bgcolor=#d6d6d6
| 506750 ||  || — || November 12, 2006 || Mount Lemmon || Mount Lemmon Survey ||  || align=right | 4.2 km || 
|-id=751 bgcolor=#fefefe
| 506751 ||  || — || November 13, 2006 || Kitt Peak || Spacewatch ||  || align=right data-sort-value="0.95" | 950 m || 
|-id=752 bgcolor=#d6d6d6
| 506752 ||  || — || October 13, 2006 || Kitt Peak || Spacewatch ||  || align=right | 2.3 km || 
|-id=753 bgcolor=#fefefe
| 506753 ||  || — || October 23, 1995 || Kitt Peak || Spacewatch || NYS || align=right data-sort-value="0.42" | 420 m || 
|-id=754 bgcolor=#d6d6d6
| 506754 ||  || — || October 23, 2006 || Mount Lemmon || Mount Lemmon Survey ||  || align=right | 2.2 km || 
|-id=755 bgcolor=#d6d6d6
| 506755 ||  || — || November 15, 2006 || Kitt Peak || Spacewatch ||  || align=right | 2.3 km || 
|-id=756 bgcolor=#fefefe
| 506756 ||  || — || November 15, 2006 || Kitt Peak || Spacewatch ||  || align=right data-sort-value="0.64" | 640 m || 
|-id=757 bgcolor=#fefefe
| 506757 ||  || — || October 17, 2006 || Kitt Peak || Spacewatch ||  || align=right data-sort-value="0.44" | 440 m || 
|-id=758 bgcolor=#fefefe
| 506758 ||  || — || November 15, 2006 || Catalina || CSS ||  || align=right data-sort-value="0.91" | 910 m || 
|-id=759 bgcolor=#fefefe
| 506759 ||  || — || November 16, 2006 || Kitt Peak || Spacewatch || NYS || align=right data-sort-value="0.41" | 410 m || 
|-id=760 bgcolor=#d6d6d6
| 506760 ||  || — || October 20, 2006 || Mount Lemmon || Mount Lemmon Survey ||  || align=right | 3.1 km || 
|-id=761 bgcolor=#fefefe
| 506761 ||  || — || November 17, 2006 || Mount Lemmon || Mount Lemmon Survey ||  || align=right data-sort-value="0.86" | 860 m || 
|-id=762 bgcolor=#fefefe
| 506762 ||  || — || October 22, 2006 || Mount Lemmon || Mount Lemmon Survey || NYS || align=right data-sort-value="0.44" | 440 m || 
|-id=763 bgcolor=#d6d6d6
| 506763 ||  || — || October 28, 2006 || Mount Lemmon || Mount Lemmon Survey ||  || align=right | 2.2 km || 
|-id=764 bgcolor=#d6d6d6
| 506764 ||  || — || November 19, 2006 || Kitt Peak || Spacewatch || THM || align=right | 2.5 km || 
|-id=765 bgcolor=#d6d6d6
| 506765 ||  || — || November 11, 2006 || Kitt Peak || Spacewatch ||  || align=right | 2.7 km || 
|-id=766 bgcolor=#fefefe
| 506766 ||  || — || November 19, 2006 || Kitt Peak || Spacewatch || MAS || align=right data-sort-value="0.66" | 660 m || 
|-id=767 bgcolor=#fefefe
| 506767 ||  || — || November 20, 2006 || Mount Lemmon || Mount Lemmon Survey ||  || align=right data-sort-value="0.79" | 790 m || 
|-id=768 bgcolor=#d6d6d6
| 506768 ||  || — || October 23, 2006 || Catalina || CSS ||  || align=right | 3.0 km || 
|-id=769 bgcolor=#d6d6d6
| 506769 ||  || — || September 28, 2006 || Mount Lemmon || Mount Lemmon Survey ||  || align=right | 2.4 km || 
|-id=770 bgcolor=#fefefe
| 506770 ||  || — || November 23, 2006 || Kitt Peak || Spacewatch || NYS || align=right data-sort-value="0.38" | 380 m || 
|-id=771 bgcolor=#fefefe
| 506771 ||  || — || October 21, 2006 || Kitt Peak || Spacewatch || MAS || align=right data-sort-value="0.49" | 490 m || 
|-id=772 bgcolor=#d6d6d6
| 506772 ||  || — || November 24, 2006 || Mount Lemmon || Mount Lemmon Survey || THM || align=right | 2.0 km || 
|-id=773 bgcolor=#d6d6d6
| 506773 ||  || — || November 16, 2006 || Mount Lemmon || Mount Lemmon Survey ||  || align=right | 2.3 km || 
|-id=774 bgcolor=#d6d6d6
| 506774 ||  || — || November 17, 2006 || Kitt Peak || Spacewatch ||  || align=right | 2.3 km || 
|-id=775 bgcolor=#fefefe
| 506775 ||  || — || December 12, 2006 || Kitt Peak || Spacewatch ||  || align=right data-sort-value="0.58" | 580 m || 
|-id=776 bgcolor=#d6d6d6
| 506776 ||  || — || December 13, 2006 || Kitt Peak || Spacewatch ||  || align=right | 2.3 km || 
|-id=777 bgcolor=#fefefe
| 506777 ||  || — || November 17, 2006 || Mount Lemmon || Mount Lemmon Survey || H || align=right data-sort-value="0.56" | 560 m || 
|-id=778 bgcolor=#d6d6d6
| 506778 ||  || — || November 11, 2006 || Kitt Peak || Spacewatch ||  || align=right | 1.8 km || 
|-id=779 bgcolor=#FFC2E0
| 506779 ||  || — || December 22, 2006 || Socorro || LINEAR || AMO +1km || align=right | 1.0 km || 
|-id=780 bgcolor=#fefefe
| 506780 ||  || — || December 1, 2006 || Mount Lemmon || Mount Lemmon Survey ||  || align=right data-sort-value="0.60" | 600 m || 
|-id=781 bgcolor=#d6d6d6
| 506781 ||  || — || December 21, 2006 || Kitt Peak || Spacewatch ||  || align=right | 3.1 km || 
|-id=782 bgcolor=#FA8072
| 506782 ||  || — || November 18, 2006 || Mount Lemmon || Mount Lemmon Survey ||  || align=right data-sort-value="0.91" | 910 m || 
|-id=783 bgcolor=#d6d6d6
| 506783 ||  || — || December 13, 2006 || Socorro || LINEAR || Tj (2.97) || align=right | 3.7 km || 
|-id=784 bgcolor=#d6d6d6
| 506784 ||  || — || January 10, 2007 || Kitt Peak || Spacewatch || Tj (2.99) || align=right | 4.1 km || 
|-id=785 bgcolor=#E9E9E9
| 506785 ||  || — || January 10, 2007 || Kitt Peak || Spacewatch ||  || align=right | 1.4 km || 
|-id=786 bgcolor=#d6d6d6
| 506786 ||  || — || January 16, 2007 || Catalina || CSS ||  || align=right | 3.2 km || 
|-id=787 bgcolor=#d6d6d6
| 506787 ||  || — || December 24, 2006 || Kitt Peak || Spacewatch || 7:4 || align=right | 4.0 km || 
|-id=788 bgcolor=#d6d6d6
| 506788 ||  || — || January 17, 2007 || Catalina || CSS || TIR || align=right | 3.3 km || 
|-id=789 bgcolor=#fefefe
| 506789 ||  || — || January 24, 2007 || Mount Lemmon || Mount Lemmon Survey || MAS || align=right data-sort-value="0.59" | 590 m || 
|-id=790 bgcolor=#fefefe
| 506790 ||  || — || January 26, 2007 || Kitt Peak || Spacewatch || NYS || align=right data-sort-value="0.53" | 530 m || 
|-id=791 bgcolor=#fefefe
| 506791 ||  || — || January 10, 2007 || Mount Lemmon || Mount Lemmon Survey ||  || align=right data-sort-value="0.78" | 780 m || 
|-id=792 bgcolor=#fefefe
| 506792 ||  || — || February 6, 2007 || Kitt Peak || Spacewatch ||  || align=right data-sort-value="0.73" | 730 m || 
|-id=793 bgcolor=#E9E9E9
| 506793 ||  || — || January 27, 2007 || Mount Lemmon || Mount Lemmon Survey ||  || align=right data-sort-value="0.77" | 770 m || 
|-id=794 bgcolor=#E9E9E9
| 506794 ||  || — || February 8, 2007 || Kitt Peak || Spacewatch ||  || align=right | 1.6 km || 
|-id=795 bgcolor=#d6d6d6
| 506795 ||  || — || February 8, 2007 || Kitt Peak || Spacewatch ||  || align=right | 2.8 km || 
|-id=796 bgcolor=#E9E9E9
| 506796 ||  || — || February 17, 2007 || Kitt Peak || Spacewatch ||  || align=right data-sort-value="0.99" | 990 m || 
|-id=797 bgcolor=#fefefe
| 506797 ||  || — || February 17, 2007 || Kitt Peak || Spacewatch ||  || align=right data-sort-value="0.59" | 590 m || 
|-id=798 bgcolor=#fefefe
| 506798 ||  || — || February 17, 2007 || Kitt Peak || Spacewatch ||  || align=right data-sort-value="0.86" | 860 m || 
|-id=799 bgcolor=#fefefe
| 506799 ||  || — || December 27, 2006 || Catalina || CSS ||  || align=right | 1.1 km || 
|-id=800 bgcolor=#fefefe
| 506800 ||  || — || January 27, 2007 || Kitt Peak || Spacewatch || NYS || align=right data-sort-value="0.47" | 470 m || 
|}

506801–506900 

|-bgcolor=#E9E9E9
| 506801 ||  || — || April 11, 2007 || Kitt Peak || Spacewatch ||  || align=right | 1.2 km || 
|-id=802 bgcolor=#E9E9E9
| 506802 ||  || — || March 13, 2007 || Mount Lemmon || Mount Lemmon Survey ||  || align=right | 1.3 km || 
|-id=803 bgcolor=#E9E9E9
| 506803 ||  || — || April 11, 2007 || Mount Lemmon || Mount Lemmon Survey ||  || align=right data-sort-value="0.94" | 940 m || 
|-id=804 bgcolor=#E9E9E9
| 506804 ||  || — || April 24, 2007 || Kitt Peak || Spacewatch ||  || align=right | 1.2 km || 
|-id=805 bgcolor=#d6d6d6
| 506805 ||  || — || February 26, 2014 || Haleakala || Pan-STARRS || 3:2 || align=right | 4.1 km || 
|-id=806 bgcolor=#E9E9E9
| 506806 ||  || — || March 25, 2007 || Mount Lemmon || Mount Lemmon Survey ||  || align=right | 1.7 km || 
|-id=807 bgcolor=#E9E9E9
| 506807 ||  || — || June 16, 2007 || Kitt Peak || Spacewatch ||  || align=right | 1.6 km || 
|-id=808 bgcolor=#FA8072
| 506808 ||  || — || June 20, 2007 || Catalina || CSS ||  || align=right | 1.8 km || 
|-id=809 bgcolor=#fefefe
| 506809 ||  || — || August 13, 2007 || Socorro || LINEAR ||  || align=right data-sort-value="0.64" | 640 m || 
|-id=810 bgcolor=#FA8072
| 506810 ||  || — || September 5, 2007 || Catalina || CSS ||  || align=right data-sort-value="0.67" | 670 m || 
|-id=811 bgcolor=#fefefe
| 506811 ||  || — || September 9, 2007 || Kitt Peak || Spacewatch ||  || align=right data-sort-value="0.57" | 570 m || 
|-id=812 bgcolor=#fefefe
| 506812 ||  || — || September 9, 2007 || Mount Lemmon || Mount Lemmon Survey ||  || align=right data-sort-value="0.52" | 520 m || 
|-id=813 bgcolor=#FA8072
| 506813 ||  || — || September 9, 2007 || Kitt Peak || Spacewatch ||  || align=right data-sort-value="0.57" | 570 m || 
|-id=814 bgcolor=#E9E9E9
| 506814 ||  || — || September 4, 2007 || Catalina || CSS ||  || align=right | 2.1 km || 
|-id=815 bgcolor=#fefefe
| 506815 ||  || — || September 13, 2007 || Kitt Peak || Spacewatch ||  || align=right data-sort-value="0.66" | 660 m || 
|-id=816 bgcolor=#E9E9E9
| 506816 ||  || — || September 10, 2007 || Kitt Peak || Spacewatch ||  || align=right | 1.8 km || 
|-id=817 bgcolor=#d6d6d6
| 506817 ||  || — || September 11, 2007 || Kitt Peak || Spacewatch || KOR || align=right | 1.1 km || 
|-id=818 bgcolor=#d6d6d6
| 506818 ||  || — || September 12, 2007 || Mount Lemmon || Mount Lemmon Survey || KOR || align=right | 1.1 km || 
|-id=819 bgcolor=#d6d6d6
| 506819 ||  || — || September 14, 2007 || Mount Lemmon || Mount Lemmon Survey || EOS || align=right | 1.3 km || 
|-id=820 bgcolor=#fefefe
| 506820 ||  || — || September 10, 2007 || Kitt Peak || Spacewatch ||  || align=right data-sort-value="0.52" | 520 m || 
|-id=821 bgcolor=#d6d6d6
| 506821 ||  || — || September 24, 2007 || Kitt Peak || Spacewatch ||  || align=right | 3.1 km || 
|-id=822 bgcolor=#d6d6d6
| 506822 ||  || — || December 14, 2010 || Mount Lemmon || Mount Lemmon Survey || 3:2 || align=right | 3.5 km || 
|-id=823 bgcolor=#d6d6d6
| 506823 ||  || — || September 24, 2007 || Kitt Peak || Spacewatch ||  || align=right | 4.0 km || 
|-id=824 bgcolor=#fefefe
| 506824 ||  || — || September 9, 2007 || Mount Lemmon || Mount Lemmon Survey ||  || align=right data-sort-value="0.68" | 680 m || 
|-id=825 bgcolor=#fefefe
| 506825 ||  || — || October 6, 2007 || Kitt Peak || Spacewatch ||  || align=right data-sort-value="0.62" | 620 m || 
|-id=826 bgcolor=#d6d6d6
| 506826 ||  || — || October 4, 2007 || Kitt Peak || Spacewatch || KOR || align=right | 1.2 km || 
|-id=827 bgcolor=#fefefe
| 506827 ||  || — || September 8, 2007 || Mount Lemmon || Mount Lemmon Survey ||  || align=right data-sort-value="0.41" | 410 m || 
|-id=828 bgcolor=#fefefe
| 506828 ||  || — || October 8, 2007 || Kitt Peak || Spacewatch ||  || align=right data-sort-value="0.57" | 570 m || 
|-id=829 bgcolor=#fefefe
| 506829 ||  || — || October 7, 2007 || Mount Lemmon || Mount Lemmon Survey ||  || align=right data-sort-value="0.68" | 680 m || 
|-id=830 bgcolor=#d6d6d6
| 506830 ||  || — || October 8, 2007 || Catalina || CSS ||  || align=right | 2.7 km || 
|-id=831 bgcolor=#d6d6d6
| 506831 ||  || — || October 9, 2007 || Mount Lemmon || Mount Lemmon Survey ||  || align=right | 1.7 km || 
|-id=832 bgcolor=#fefefe
| 506832 ||  || — || September 8, 2007 || Anderson Mesa || LONEOS ||  || align=right data-sort-value="0.62" | 620 m || 
|-id=833 bgcolor=#d6d6d6
| 506833 ||  || — || August 24, 2007 || Kitt Peak || Spacewatch ||  || align=right | 1.5 km || 
|-id=834 bgcolor=#d6d6d6
| 506834 ||  || — || October 10, 2007 || Kitt Peak || Spacewatch || KOR || align=right | 1.1 km || 
|-id=835 bgcolor=#fefefe
| 506835 ||  || — || October 9, 2007 || Mount Lemmon || Mount Lemmon Survey || H || align=right data-sort-value="0.55" | 550 m || 
|-id=836 bgcolor=#fefefe
| 506836 ||  || — || September 12, 2007 || Mount Lemmon || Mount Lemmon Survey ||  || align=right data-sort-value="0.49" | 490 m || 
|-id=837 bgcolor=#fefefe
| 506837 ||  || — || October 9, 2007 || Kitt Peak || Spacewatch ||  || align=right data-sort-value="0.44" | 440 m || 
|-id=838 bgcolor=#fefefe
| 506838 ||  || — || October 9, 2007 || Kitt Peak || Spacewatch ||  || align=right data-sort-value="0.78" | 780 m || 
|-id=839 bgcolor=#fefefe
| 506839 ||  || — || October 12, 2007 || Kitt Peak || Spacewatch ||  || align=right data-sort-value="0.47" | 470 m || 
|-id=840 bgcolor=#fefefe
| 506840 ||  || — || October 12, 2007 || Kitt Peak || Spacewatch ||  || align=right data-sort-value="0.74" | 740 m || 
|-id=841 bgcolor=#fefefe
| 506841 ||  || — || October 7, 2007 || Kitt Peak || Spacewatch ||  || align=right data-sort-value="0.73" | 730 m || 
|-id=842 bgcolor=#d6d6d6
| 506842 ||  || — || September 18, 2007 || Mount Lemmon || Mount Lemmon Survey ||  || align=right | 2.2 km || 
|-id=843 bgcolor=#d6d6d6
| 506843 ||  || — || October 14, 2007 || Mount Lemmon || Mount Lemmon Survey || EOS || align=right | 1.7 km || 
|-id=844 bgcolor=#d6d6d6
| 506844 ||  || — || October 15, 2007 || Mount Lemmon || Mount Lemmon Survey ||  || align=right | 2.2 km || 
|-id=845 bgcolor=#d6d6d6
| 506845 ||  || — || September 15, 2007 || Mount Lemmon || Mount Lemmon Survey ||  || align=right | 3.2 km || 
|-id=846 bgcolor=#fefefe
| 506846 ||  || — || October 8, 2007 || Catalina || CSS ||  || align=right data-sort-value="0.72" | 720 m || 
|-id=847 bgcolor=#FA8072
| 506847 ||  || — || October 8, 2007 || Anderson Mesa || LONEOS ||  || align=right data-sort-value="0.50" | 500 m || 
|-id=848 bgcolor=#d6d6d6
| 506848 ||  || — || October 12, 2007 || Kitt Peak || Spacewatch || KOR || align=right | 1.1 km || 
|-id=849 bgcolor=#d6d6d6
| 506849 ||  || — || October 18, 2007 || Kitt Peak || Spacewatch ||  || align=right | 1.7 km || 
|-id=850 bgcolor=#d6d6d6
| 506850 ||  || — || October 30, 2007 || Kitt Peak || Spacewatch ||  || align=right | 2.5 km || 
|-id=851 bgcolor=#E9E9E9
| 506851 ||  || — || October 30, 2007 || Kitt Peak || Spacewatch ||  || align=right | 2.6 km || 
|-id=852 bgcolor=#E9E9E9
| 506852 ||  || — || September 19, 2007 || Kitt Peak || Spacewatch ||  || align=right | 2.3 km || 
|-id=853 bgcolor=#fefefe
| 506853 ||  || — || October 21, 2007 || Mount Lemmon || Mount Lemmon Survey ||  || align=right data-sort-value="0.65" | 650 m || 
|-id=854 bgcolor=#fefefe
| 506854 ||  || — || September 11, 2007 || Mount Lemmon || Mount Lemmon Survey ||  || align=right data-sort-value="0.57" | 570 m || 
|-id=855 bgcolor=#d6d6d6
| 506855 ||  || — || November 1, 2007 || Kitt Peak || Spacewatch ||  || align=right | 2.0 km || 
|-id=856 bgcolor=#d6d6d6
| 506856 ||  || — || November 1, 2007 || Kitt Peak || Spacewatch ||  || align=right | 1.9 km || 
|-id=857 bgcolor=#d6d6d6
| 506857 ||  || — || November 3, 2007 || Kitt Peak || Spacewatch || KOR || align=right | 1.2 km || 
|-id=858 bgcolor=#fefefe
| 506858 ||  || — || October 20, 2007 || Kitt Peak || Spacewatch ||  || align=right data-sort-value="0.45" | 450 m || 
|-id=859 bgcolor=#FFC2E0
| 506859 ||  || — || November 8, 2007 || Socorro || LINEAR || APO +1kmPHA || align=right data-sort-value="0.81" | 810 m || 
|-id=860 bgcolor=#d6d6d6
| 506860 ||  || — || October 10, 2007 || Kitt Peak || Spacewatch ||  || align=right | 2.2 km || 
|-id=861 bgcolor=#FA8072
| 506861 ||  || — || October 21, 2007 || Mount Lemmon || Mount Lemmon Survey || H || align=right data-sort-value="0.39" | 390 m || 
|-id=862 bgcolor=#d6d6d6
| 506862 ||  || — || October 8, 2007 || Mount Lemmon || Mount Lemmon Survey || KOR || align=right | 1.2 km || 
|-id=863 bgcolor=#fefefe
| 506863 ||  || — || October 31, 2007 || Mount Lemmon || Mount Lemmon Survey ||  || align=right data-sort-value="0.65" | 650 m || 
|-id=864 bgcolor=#fefefe
| 506864 ||  || — || November 11, 2007 || Mount Lemmon || Mount Lemmon Survey ||  || align=right data-sort-value="0.47" | 470 m || 
|-id=865 bgcolor=#fefefe
| 506865 ||  || — || October 10, 2007 || Mount Lemmon || Mount Lemmon Survey ||  || align=right data-sort-value="0.69" | 690 m || 
|-id=866 bgcolor=#d6d6d6
| 506866 ||  || — || November 7, 2007 || Mount Lemmon || Mount Lemmon Survey ||  || align=right | 2.6 km || 
|-id=867 bgcolor=#fefefe
| 506867 ||  || — || November 19, 2007 || Mount Lemmon || Mount Lemmon Survey ||  || align=right data-sort-value="0.62" | 620 m || 
|-id=868 bgcolor=#fefefe
| 506868 ||  || — || October 14, 2007 || Mount Lemmon || Mount Lemmon Survey ||  || align=right data-sort-value="0.78" | 780 m || 
|-id=869 bgcolor=#d6d6d6
| 506869 ||  || — || December 5, 2007 || Kitt Peak || Spacewatch ||  || align=right | 2.3 km || 
|-id=870 bgcolor=#d6d6d6
| 506870 ||  || — || November 18, 2007 || Kitt Peak || Spacewatch ||  || align=right | 2.4 km || 
|-id=871 bgcolor=#d6d6d6
| 506871 ||  || — || December 5, 2007 || Kitt Peak || Spacewatch ||  || align=right | 2.3 km || 
|-id=872 bgcolor=#d6d6d6
| 506872 ||  || — || December 3, 2007 || Kitt Peak || Spacewatch ||  || align=right | 2.8 km || 
|-id=873 bgcolor=#d6d6d6
| 506873 ||  || — || December 15, 2007 || Mount Lemmon || Mount Lemmon Survey ||  || align=right | 2.5 km || 
|-id=874 bgcolor=#d6d6d6
| 506874 ||  || — || December 30, 2007 || Mount Lemmon || Mount Lemmon Survey ||  || align=right | 2.1 km || 
|-id=875 bgcolor=#fefefe
| 506875 ||  || — || January 10, 2008 || Mount Lemmon || Mount Lemmon Survey ||  || align=right data-sort-value="0.70" | 700 m || 
|-id=876 bgcolor=#d6d6d6
| 506876 ||  || — || December 30, 2007 || Kitt Peak || Spacewatch ||  || align=right | 2.6 km || 
|-id=877 bgcolor=#fefefe
| 506877 ||  || — || December 30, 2007 || Kitt Peak || Spacewatch ||  || align=right data-sort-value="0.73" | 730 m || 
|-id=878 bgcolor=#d6d6d6
| 506878 ||  || — || December 30, 2007 || Kitt Peak || Spacewatch ||  || align=right | 2.0 km || 
|-id=879 bgcolor=#d6d6d6
| 506879 ||  || — || November 7, 2007 || Mount Lemmon || Mount Lemmon Survey ||  || align=right | 3.4 km || 
|-id=880 bgcolor=#d6d6d6
| 506880 ||  || — || December 5, 2007 || Kitt Peak || Spacewatch ||  || align=right | 2.4 km || 
|-id=881 bgcolor=#fefefe
| 506881 ||  || — || December 31, 2007 || Mount Lemmon || Mount Lemmon Survey ||  || align=right data-sort-value="0.52" | 520 m || 
|-id=882 bgcolor=#d6d6d6
| 506882 ||  || — || December 31, 2007 || Mount Lemmon || Mount Lemmon Survey ||  || align=right | 2.6 km || 
|-id=883 bgcolor=#d6d6d6
| 506883 ||  || — || January 11, 2008 || Kitt Peak || Spacewatch ||  || align=right | 2.2 km || 
|-id=884 bgcolor=#d6d6d6
| 506884 ||  || — || January 11, 2008 || Kitt Peak || Spacewatch ||  || align=right | 2.6 km || 
|-id=885 bgcolor=#d6d6d6
| 506885 ||  || — || January 12, 2008 || Kitt Peak || Spacewatch ||  || align=right | 2.3 km || 
|-id=886 bgcolor=#d6d6d6
| 506886 ||  || — || December 14, 2007 || Mount Lemmon || Mount Lemmon Survey ||  || align=right | 2.0 km || 
|-id=887 bgcolor=#d6d6d6
| 506887 ||  || — || January 13, 2008 || Kitt Peak || Spacewatch ||  || align=right | 2.1 km || 
|-id=888 bgcolor=#d6d6d6
| 506888 ||  || — || November 11, 2007 || Mount Lemmon || Mount Lemmon Survey ||  || align=right | 2.6 km || 
|-id=889 bgcolor=#d6d6d6
| 506889 ||  || — || January 12, 2008 || Kitt Peak || Spacewatch ||  || align=right | 2.7 km || 
|-id=890 bgcolor=#d6d6d6
| 506890 ||  || — || November 12, 2007 || Mount Lemmon || Mount Lemmon Survey ||  || align=right | 2.4 km || 
|-id=891 bgcolor=#d6d6d6
| 506891 ||  || — || January 13, 2008 || Mount Lemmon || Mount Lemmon Survey ||  || align=right | 3.1 km || 
|-id=892 bgcolor=#fefefe
| 506892 ||  || — || December 30, 2007 || Mount Lemmon || Mount Lemmon Survey ||  || align=right data-sort-value="0.69" | 690 m || 
|-id=893 bgcolor=#fefefe
| 506893 ||  || — || January 30, 2008 || Kitt Peak || Spacewatch ||  || align=right data-sort-value="0.68" | 680 m || 
|-id=894 bgcolor=#d6d6d6
| 506894 ||  || — || January 18, 2008 || Kitt Peak || Spacewatch ||  || align=right | 3.2 km || 
|-id=895 bgcolor=#d6d6d6
| 506895 ||  || — || January 20, 2008 || Kitt Peak || Spacewatch ||  || align=right | 2.5 km || 
|-id=896 bgcolor=#d6d6d6
| 506896 ||  || — || January 10, 2008 || Catalina || CSS ||  || align=right | 3.9 km || 
|-id=897 bgcolor=#d6d6d6
| 506897 ||  || — || February 2, 2008 || Kitt Peak || Spacewatch ||  || align=right | 2.5 km || 
|-id=898 bgcolor=#d6d6d6
| 506898 ||  || — || February 8, 2008 || Mount Lemmon || Mount Lemmon Survey ||  || align=right | 2.7 km || 
|-id=899 bgcolor=#d6d6d6
| 506899 ||  || — || February 9, 2008 || Mount Lemmon || Mount Lemmon Survey ||  || align=right | 2.8 km || 
|-id=900 bgcolor=#fefefe
| 506900 ||  || — || February 9, 2008 || Mount Lemmon || Mount Lemmon Survey ||  || align=right data-sort-value="0.63" | 630 m || 
|}

506901–507000 

|-bgcolor=#fefefe
| 506901 ||  || — || February 8, 2008 || Kitt Peak || Spacewatch ||  || align=right data-sort-value="0.56" | 560 m || 
|-id=902 bgcolor=#fefefe
| 506902 ||  || — || February 8, 2008 || Kitt Peak || Spacewatch ||  || align=right data-sort-value="0.71" | 710 m || 
|-id=903 bgcolor=#d6d6d6
| 506903 ||  || — || February 9, 2008 || Kitt Peak || Spacewatch ||  || align=right | 2.2 km || 
|-id=904 bgcolor=#d6d6d6
| 506904 ||  || — || January 31, 2008 || Mount Lemmon || Mount Lemmon Survey ||  || align=right | 1.9 km || 
|-id=905 bgcolor=#fefefe
| 506905 ||  || — || May 15, 2005 || Mount Lemmon || Mount Lemmon Survey ||  || align=right | 1.0 km || 
|-id=906 bgcolor=#fefefe
| 506906 ||  || — || February 11, 2008 || Mount Lemmon || Mount Lemmon Survey || H || align=right data-sort-value="0.63" | 630 m || 
|-id=907 bgcolor=#fefefe
| 506907 ||  || — || February 11, 2008 || Mount Lemmon || Mount Lemmon Survey ||  || align=right data-sort-value="0.63" | 630 m || 
|-id=908 bgcolor=#fefefe
| 506908 ||  || — || January 30, 2008 || Mount Lemmon || Mount Lemmon Survey ||  || align=right data-sort-value="0.59" | 590 m || 
|-id=909 bgcolor=#fefefe
| 506909 ||  || — || February 2, 2008 || Kitt Peak || Spacewatch ||  || align=right data-sort-value="0.81" | 810 m || 
|-id=910 bgcolor=#d6d6d6
| 506910 ||  || — || February 9, 2008 || Kitt Peak || Spacewatch || THM || align=right | 1.8 km || 
|-id=911 bgcolor=#d6d6d6
| 506911 ||  || — || February 11, 2008 || Mount Lemmon || Mount Lemmon Survey ||  || align=right | 2.5 km || 
|-id=912 bgcolor=#fefefe
| 506912 ||  || — || February 13, 2008 || Catalina || CSS ||  || align=right data-sort-value="0.81" | 810 m || 
|-id=913 bgcolor=#fefefe
| 506913 ||  || — || February 8, 2008 || Kitt Peak || Spacewatch ||  || align=right data-sort-value="0.56" | 560 m || 
|-id=914 bgcolor=#d6d6d6
| 506914 ||  || — || February 27, 2008 || Mount Lemmon || Mount Lemmon Survey ||  || align=right | 2.5 km || 
|-id=915 bgcolor=#fefefe
| 506915 ||  || — || February 26, 2008 || Mount Lemmon || Mount Lemmon Survey || MAS || align=right data-sort-value="0.68" | 680 m || 
|-id=916 bgcolor=#d6d6d6
| 506916 ||  || — || February 28, 2008 || Mount Lemmon || Mount Lemmon Survey || THM || align=right | 1.7 km || 
|-id=917 bgcolor=#d6d6d6
| 506917 ||  || — || March 1, 2008 || Kitt Peak || Spacewatch ||  || align=right | 2.8 km || 
|-id=918 bgcolor=#fefefe
| 506918 ||  || — || February 10, 2008 || Kitt Peak || Spacewatch ||  || align=right data-sort-value="0.75" | 750 m || 
|-id=919 bgcolor=#fefefe
| 506919 ||  || — || March 7, 2008 || Kitt Peak || Spacewatch ||  || align=right data-sort-value="0.78" | 780 m || 
|-id=920 bgcolor=#d6d6d6
| 506920 ||  || — || February 28, 2008 || Kitt Peak || Spacewatch ||  || align=right | 3.1 km || 
|-id=921 bgcolor=#fefefe
| 506921 ||  || — || March 8, 2008 || Socorro || LINEAR ||  || align=right | 1.2 km || 
|-id=922 bgcolor=#d6d6d6
| 506922 ||  || — || March 9, 2008 || Mount Lemmon || Mount Lemmon Survey ||  || align=right | 2.2 km || 
|-id=923 bgcolor=#fefefe
| 506923 ||  || — || March 9, 2008 || Kitt Peak || Spacewatch || NYS || align=right data-sort-value="0.65" | 650 m || 
|-id=924 bgcolor=#fefefe
| 506924 ||  || — || February 27, 2008 || Kitt Peak || Spacewatch ||  || align=right data-sort-value="0.75" | 750 m || 
|-id=925 bgcolor=#fefefe
| 506925 ||  || — || September 25, 2006 || Kitt Peak || Spacewatch ||  || align=right data-sort-value="0.55" | 550 m || 
|-id=926 bgcolor=#fefefe
| 506926 ||  || — || February 28, 2008 || Mount Lemmon || Mount Lemmon Survey || MAS || align=right data-sort-value="0.56" | 560 m || 
|-id=927 bgcolor=#fefefe
| 506927 ||  || — || February 13, 2008 || Kitt Peak || Spacewatch ||  || align=right data-sort-value="0.65" | 650 m || 
|-id=928 bgcolor=#fefefe
| 506928 ||  || — || March 27, 2008 || Kitt Peak || Spacewatch ||  || align=right data-sort-value="0.76" | 760 m || 
|-id=929 bgcolor=#fefefe
| 506929 ||  || — || March 27, 2008 || Kitt Peak || Spacewatch ||  || align=right data-sort-value="0.60" | 600 m || 
|-id=930 bgcolor=#d6d6d6
| 506930 ||  || — || March 29, 2008 || Kitt Peak || Spacewatch ||  || align=right | 2.5 km || 
|-id=931 bgcolor=#d6d6d6
| 506931 ||  || — || February 1, 2008 || Kitt Peak || Spacewatch ||  || align=right | 2.4 km || 
|-id=932 bgcolor=#fefefe
| 506932 ||  || — || March 28, 2008 || Mount Lemmon || Mount Lemmon Survey || MAS || align=right data-sort-value="0.54" | 540 m || 
|-id=933 bgcolor=#d6d6d6
| 506933 ||  || — || March 5, 2008 || Mount Lemmon || Mount Lemmon Survey ||  || align=right | 2.8 km || 
|-id=934 bgcolor=#d6d6d6
| 506934 ||  || — || March 15, 2008 || Kitt Peak || Spacewatch ||  || align=right | 2.1 km || 
|-id=935 bgcolor=#d6d6d6
| 506935 ||  || — || April 1, 2008 || Mount Lemmon || Mount Lemmon Survey || EUP || align=right | 3.1 km || 
|-id=936 bgcolor=#d6d6d6
| 506936 ||  || — || March 27, 2008 || Mount Lemmon || Mount Lemmon Survey || THM || align=right | 1.8 km || 
|-id=937 bgcolor=#fefefe
| 506937 ||  || — || March 12, 2008 || Mount Lemmon || Mount Lemmon Survey ||  || align=right data-sort-value="0.67" | 670 m || 
|-id=938 bgcolor=#d6d6d6
| 506938 ||  || — || March 10, 2008 || Kitt Peak || Spacewatch ||  || align=right | 2.6 km || 
|-id=939 bgcolor=#fefefe
| 506939 ||  || — || February 28, 2008 || Mount Lemmon || Mount Lemmon Survey ||  || align=right data-sort-value="0.74" | 740 m || 
|-id=940 bgcolor=#fefefe
| 506940 ||  || — || April 9, 2008 || Kitt Peak || Spacewatch ||  || align=right data-sort-value="0.78" | 780 m || 
|-id=941 bgcolor=#fefefe
| 506941 ||  || — || March 31, 2008 || Mount Lemmon || Mount Lemmon Survey || H || align=right data-sort-value="0.72" | 720 m || 
|-id=942 bgcolor=#fefefe
| 506942 ||  || — || April 5, 2008 || Mount Lemmon || Mount Lemmon Survey ||  || align=right data-sort-value="0.68" | 680 m || 
|-id=943 bgcolor=#fefefe
| 506943 ||  || — || April 9, 2008 || Kitt Peak || Spacewatch || MAS || align=right data-sort-value="0.68" | 680 m || 
|-id=944 bgcolor=#fefefe
| 506944 ||  || — || April 27, 2008 || Kitt Peak || Spacewatch || (5026) || align=right data-sort-value="0.75" | 750 m || 
|-id=945 bgcolor=#fefefe
| 506945 ||  || — || April 27, 2008 || Kitt Peak || Spacewatch || H || align=right data-sort-value="0.58" | 580 m || 
|-id=946 bgcolor=#fefefe
| 506946 ||  || — || April 29, 2008 || Kitt Peak || Spacewatch ||  || align=right data-sort-value="0.75" | 750 m || 
|-id=947 bgcolor=#fefefe
| 506947 ||  || — || May 14, 2008 || Kitt Peak || Spacewatch || H || align=right data-sort-value="0.45" | 450 m || 
|-id=948 bgcolor=#fefefe
| 506948 ||  || — || May 13, 2008 || Mount Lemmon || Mount Lemmon Survey || H || align=right data-sort-value="0.68" | 680 m || 
|-id=949 bgcolor=#fefefe
| 506949 ||  || — || May 29, 2008 || Kitt Peak || Spacewatch || H || align=right data-sort-value="0.66" | 660 m || 
|-id=950 bgcolor=#fefefe
| 506950 ||  || — || May 28, 2008 || Kitt Peak || Spacewatch || H || align=right data-sort-value="0.72" | 720 m || 
|-id=951 bgcolor=#FFC2E0
| 506951 ||  || — || May 31, 2008 || Kitt Peak || Spacewatch || AMO || align=right data-sort-value="0.26" | 260 m || 
|-id=952 bgcolor=#d6d6d6
| 506952 ||  || — || April 29, 2008 || Kitt Peak || Spacewatch ||  || align=right | 2.9 km || 
|-id=953 bgcolor=#E9E9E9
| 506953 ||  || — || May 30, 2008 || Mount Lemmon || Mount Lemmon Survey ||  || align=right data-sort-value="0.87" | 870 m || 
|-id=954 bgcolor=#fefefe
| 506954 ||  || — || May 28, 2008 || Mount Lemmon || Mount Lemmon Survey ||  || align=right data-sort-value="0.97" | 970 m || 
|-id=955 bgcolor=#d6d6d6
| 506955 ||  || — || May 26, 2008 || Kitt Peak || Spacewatch ||  || align=right | 3.3 km || 
|-id=956 bgcolor=#E9E9E9
| 506956 ||  || — || May 31, 2008 || Mount Lemmon || Mount Lemmon Survey ||  || align=right | 1.1 km || 
|-id=957 bgcolor=#E9E9E9
| 506957 ||  || — || August 7, 2008 || Kitt Peak || Spacewatch ||  || align=right | 1.4 km || 
|-id=958 bgcolor=#E9E9E9
| 506958 ||  || — || July 26, 2008 || Siding Spring || SSS ||  || align=right | 1.5 km || 
|-id=959 bgcolor=#E9E9E9
| 506959 ||  || — || August 21, 2008 || Kitt Peak || Spacewatch ||  || align=right | 1.2 km || 
|-id=960 bgcolor=#E9E9E9
| 506960 ||  || — || August 20, 2008 || Kitt Peak || Spacewatch ||  || align=right | 1.3 km || 
|-id=961 bgcolor=#E9E9E9
| 506961 ||  || — || September 4, 2008 || Kitt Peak || Spacewatch ||  || align=right | 1.2 km || 
|-id=962 bgcolor=#E9E9E9
| 506962 ||  || — || September 5, 2008 || Kitt Peak || Spacewatch ||  || align=right | 1.9 km || 
|-id=963 bgcolor=#E9E9E9
| 506963 ||  || — || September 5, 2008 || Kitt Peak || Spacewatch ||  || align=right | 1.5 km || 
|-id=964 bgcolor=#E9E9E9
| 506964 ||  || — || November 10, 2004 || Kitt Peak || Spacewatch ||  || align=right | 1.1 km || 
|-id=965 bgcolor=#E9E9E9
| 506965 ||  || — || September 6, 2008 || Kitt Peak || Spacewatch ||  || align=right | 1.1 km || 
|-id=966 bgcolor=#d6d6d6
| 506966 ||  || — || September 7, 2008 || Mount Lemmon || Mount Lemmon Survey || 3:2 || align=right | 3.9 km || 
|-id=967 bgcolor=#E9E9E9
| 506967 ||  || — || September 4, 2008 || Kitt Peak || Spacewatch ||  || align=right | 1.2 km || 
|-id=968 bgcolor=#E9E9E9
| 506968 ||  || — || September 8, 2008 || Kitt Peak || Spacewatch ||  || align=right | 1.5 km || 
|-id=969 bgcolor=#E9E9E9
| 506969 ||  || — || September 9, 2008 || Catalina || CSS || EUN || align=right | 1.4 km || 
|-id=970 bgcolor=#E9E9E9
| 506970 ||  || — || July 29, 2008 || Kitt Peak || Spacewatch ||  || align=right | 1.4 km || 
|-id=971 bgcolor=#E9E9E9
| 506971 ||  || — || September 20, 2008 || Kitt Peak || Spacewatch ||  || align=right | 1.5 km || 
|-id=972 bgcolor=#E9E9E9
| 506972 ||  || — || September 20, 2008 || Kitt Peak || Spacewatch ||  || align=right | 1.3 km || 
|-id=973 bgcolor=#E9E9E9
| 506973 ||  || — || September 5, 2008 || Kitt Peak || Spacewatch || EUN || align=right data-sort-value="0.82" | 820 m || 
|-id=974 bgcolor=#E9E9E9
| 506974 ||  || — || September 21, 2008 || Kitt Peak || Spacewatch ||  || align=right | 1.6 km || 
|-id=975 bgcolor=#E9E9E9
| 506975 ||  || — || September 21, 2008 || Catalina || CSS ||  || align=right | 1.7 km || 
|-id=976 bgcolor=#E9E9E9
| 506976 ||  || — || September 22, 2008 || Mount Lemmon || Mount Lemmon Survey ||  || align=right | 1.3 km || 
|-id=977 bgcolor=#E9E9E9
| 506977 ||  || — || September 22, 2008 || Kitt Peak || Spacewatch ||  || align=right | 1.2 km || 
|-id=978 bgcolor=#E9E9E9
| 506978 ||  || — || September 23, 2008 || Kitt Peak || Spacewatch ||  || align=right | 1.4 km || 
|-id=979 bgcolor=#E9E9E9
| 506979 ||  || — || September 22, 2008 || Socorro || LINEAR ||  || align=right | 1.4 km || 
|-id=980 bgcolor=#E9E9E9
| 506980 ||  || — || September 28, 2008 || Socorro || LINEAR ||  || align=right | 1.3 km || 
|-id=981 bgcolor=#E9E9E9
| 506981 ||  || — || August 24, 2008 || Kitt Peak || Spacewatch ||  || align=right | 1.3 km || 
|-id=982 bgcolor=#E9E9E9
| 506982 ||  || — || September 24, 2008 || Kitt Peak || Spacewatch ||  || align=right | 1.6 km || 
|-id=983 bgcolor=#E9E9E9
| 506983 ||  || — || September 9, 2008 || Mount Lemmon || Mount Lemmon Survey || JUN || align=right data-sort-value="0.98" | 980 m || 
|-id=984 bgcolor=#E9E9E9
| 506984 ||  || — || September 25, 2008 || Kitt Peak || Spacewatch ||  || align=right | 1.4 km || 
|-id=985 bgcolor=#E9E9E9
| 506985 ||  || — || September 26, 2008 || Kitt Peak || Spacewatch ||  || align=right | 1.2 km || 
|-id=986 bgcolor=#E9E9E9
| 506986 ||  || — || September 26, 2008 || Kitt Peak || Spacewatch ||  || align=right | 2.2 km || 
|-id=987 bgcolor=#E9E9E9
| 506987 ||  || — || September 26, 2008 || Kitt Peak || Spacewatch ||  || align=right | 1.6 km || 
|-id=988 bgcolor=#E9E9E9
| 506988 ||  || — || July 30, 2008 || Mount Lemmon || Mount Lemmon Survey ||  || align=right | 1.7 km || 
|-id=989 bgcolor=#E9E9E9
| 506989 ||  || — || September 29, 2008 || La Sagra || OAM Obs. ||  || align=right | 1.8 km || 
|-id=990 bgcolor=#E9E9E9
| 506990 ||  || — || September 26, 2008 || Kitt Peak || Spacewatch || EUN || align=right | 1.1 km || 
|-id=991 bgcolor=#E9E9E9
| 506991 ||  || — || September 4, 2008 || Kitt Peak || Spacewatch ||  || align=right | 1.7 km || 
|-id=992 bgcolor=#E9E9E9
| 506992 ||  || — || September 29, 2008 || Kitt Peak || Spacewatch ||  || align=right | 1.8 km || 
|-id=993 bgcolor=#E9E9E9
| 506993 ||  || — || September 26, 2008 || Kitt Peak || Spacewatch ||  || align=right | 1.2 km || 
|-id=994 bgcolor=#E9E9E9
| 506994 ||  || — || September 28, 2008 || Mount Lemmon || Mount Lemmon Survey ||  || align=right | 3.1 km || 
|-id=995 bgcolor=#E9E9E9
| 506995 ||  || — || September 25, 2008 || Kitt Peak || Spacewatch ||  || align=right | 1.1 km || 
|-id=996 bgcolor=#E9E9E9
| 506996 ||  || — || September 25, 2008 || Mount Lemmon || Mount Lemmon Survey ||  || align=right | 2.0 km || 
|-id=997 bgcolor=#E9E9E9
| 506997 ||  || — || September 23, 2008 || Catalina || CSS ||  || align=right | 1.4 km || 
|-id=998 bgcolor=#E9E9E9
| 506998 ||  || — || September 30, 2008 || Mount Lemmon || Mount Lemmon Survey ||  || align=right | 1.5 km || 
|-id=999 bgcolor=#E9E9E9
| 506999 ||  || — || September 7, 2008 || Mount Lemmon || Mount Lemmon Survey ||  || align=right | 1.3 km || 
|-id=000 bgcolor=#E9E9E9
| 507000 ||  || — || October 1, 2008 || Mount Lemmon || Mount Lemmon Survey ||  || align=right | 1.1 km || 
|}

References

External links 
 Discovery Circumstances: Numbered Minor Planets (505001)–(510000) (IAU Minor Planet Center)

0506